= Marcelo Pérez (priest) =

Mexican Catholic priest and indigenous rights advocate (1974–2024)

- Church: Catholic Church
- Diocese: San Cristóbal de las Casas

Orders
- Ordination: April 6, 2002 by Cardinal Felipe Arizmendi Esquivel

Personal details
- Born: Marcelo Pérez Pérez; January 17, 1974 San Andrés Larráinzar, Chiapas, Mexico
- Died: October 20, 2024 (aged 50) San Cristobal de las Casas, Chiapas
- Buried: San Andrés Larráinzar, Chiapas

Marcelo Pérez Pérez (January 17, 1974 – October 20, 2024) was a Mexican diocesan priest and Indigenous rights activist. He was murdered in 2024 on his way to Mass.

== Life ==
Pérez was born on 17 January 1974 in San Andrés Larráinzar, Chiapas. He was the son of indigenous Tzotzil peasants and was religious from a young age. He was encouraged by Felipe Arizmendi Esquivel, the Bishop of Chiapas at the time, to pursue the priesthood. In 1990, Pérez began attending Our Lady of Guadalupe seminary in the diocese of Tuxtla Gutiérrez. He was sent to Chenalhó in 2001, where he met and was inspired by survivors of the 1997 Acteal massacre. He was ordained on April 6 of the following year by Esquivel. He later served in Pantelhó.

Pérez was outspoken against cartel violence; he led several anti-violence marches and was known as a negotiator between various social groups. After the indigenous self-defense group El Machete kidnapped twenty-one people on 26 July 2021, Pérez pleaded with them to release the hostages, some of whom were members of the rival Hererra clan. However, only two people were found and no information emerged on the other nineteen. Believing Pérez to be part of the kidnaping scheme, the Attorney General of Chiapas ordered an arrest warrant against him, although it never got executed. He was also outspoken about indigenous rights and farmworker and peasants' rights. His work made him the target of violence; in 2008, someone set fire to his parish house, and in December 2010, he was beaten. The following year, was transferred to Simojovel.

In 2018, he was recognized by the Swedish Embassy and nominated for the 2020 Per Anger Prize for his human rights work with Pueblo Creyente de Simojovel.

After receiving death threats for his work, his diocese transferred him in October 2021 to the Guadalupe parish in San Cristóbal de las Casas.

In September 2024, he participated in a Pilgrimage for Peace in Tuxtla Gutiérrez.

== Murder ==
On October 20, 2024, after Pérez finished celebrating his first Mass of the day, he was shot and killed by two men riding a motorcycle while he was driving alone to preside over another Mass in the neighborhood of Cuxtitali in San Cristóbal de las Casas. By October 22, police had arrested one suspect in the killing, who was identified as a local drug dealer.

A Mass in his honor was held on October 21 in Spanish and Tzotzil. His funeral was held the following day in San Andrés Larráinzar, where hundreds of attendees chanted "Long live Father Marcelo, priest of the poor!"

== Reactions ==
Pérez Pérez's murder was denounced by a number of human rights and religious groups, including the Mexican office of the U.N. High Commissioner for Human Rights, the Jesuit Order in Mexico, the Episcopal Conference of Mexico, the Episcopal Conference of Latin America, and Bishop Rodrigo Aguilar Martínez of San Cristóbal de Las Casas, who called for "decisive action to restore peace in the country and especially in Chiapas". Government officials also responded to his death: President Claudia Sheinbaum said the murder was under investigation and would be punished, Chiapas governor Rutilio Escandón called the killing "cowardly" and federal security secretary Rosa Icela Rodríguez Velázquez promised there "will be no impunity" for the responsible parties.
