= Rogelio Cabrera López =

Mexican clergy

- Archbishop of Monterrey
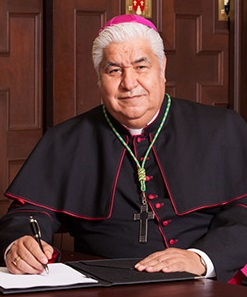
- Church: Catholic Church
- Archdiocese: Monterrey
- Appointed: 3 October 2012
- Predecessor: Francisco Robles Ortega
- Previous posts: Bishop of Tacámbaro (1996–2001); Bishop of Tapachula (2001–2004); Bishop/Archbishop of Tuxtla Gutiérrez (2004–2012)

Orders
- Ordination: 17 November 1978
- Consecration: 30 May 1996 by Girolamo Prigione

Personal details
- Born: 24 January 1951 (age 75) Santa Catarina, Guanajuato

Rogelio Cabrera López (born 24 January 1951) is a Mexican prelate of the Catholic Church who has been the archbishop of Monterrey since 2012. He has been a bishop since 1996.

== Biography ==
Rogelio Cabrera López was born in Santa Catarina, Guanajuato. He studied humanities, philosophy, and theology at the seminary of his home diocese of Querétaro from 1961 to 1973. He completed his studies in Rome at the Pontifical Gregorian University and the Pontifical Biblical Institute, obtaining licentiates in theology and sacred scripture. He was ordained a priest on 17 November 1978.

He then held the following positions: prefect of studies of the major seminary from 1978 to 1984; diocesan assistant of the Christian Family Movement from 1981 to 1992; priest of Our Lady of Peace parish from 1984 to 1990; dean of the Deanery of Santo Niño de la Salud from 1985 to 1987; diocesan coordinator of the Pastoral Plan from 1989 to 1996; member of the College of Consultants of the Diocese of Querétaro from 1989 to 1996; pastor of Our Lady of Perpetual Help parish from 1990 to 1996; master of the diocesan seminary from 1978 to 1996; Episcopal Pastoral Vicar from 1992 to 1996.

Pope John Paul II appointed him bishop of Tacámbaro on 30 April 1996. He received his episcopal consecration on 30 May 1996 from Archbishop Girolamo Prigione, Apostolic Nuncio to Mexico. On 16 July 2001, he was transferred by Pope John Paul to Tapachula.

On 11 September 2004, he was appointed bishop of Tuxtla Gutiérrez. He became its first archbishop on 25 November 2006 when the diocese was raised to the status of an archdiocese. In 2009, he was elected to a three-year term as vice-president of the Mexican Bishops Conference and he was elected to a second term.

On 3 October 2012, Pope Benedict XVI appointed him archbishop of Monterrey. He participated in the Synod of Bishops in November 2012. He was installed in Monterrey on 5 December with a ceremony in the cathedral followed by a Mass attended by 10,000 people in the Monterrey Arena.

He was elected to a three-year term as president of the Mexican Bishops Conference in 2018. On 15 May 2019, he was named president of the economic council of the Latin American Bishops Conference (CELAM). On 10 March 2021, Pope Francis made him a member of the Pontifical Commission for Latin America.

He served as apostolic administrator of two of his suffragan dioceses: Tampico from 20 July 2018 to 5 July 2019 and Ciudad Victoria from 30 March 2021 to 17 November 2021.

Catholic Church titles
Preceded by Alberto Suárez Inda	Bishop of Tacambaro; 30 April 1996 – 16 July 2001	Succeeded by José Luis Castro Medellín
Preceded by Felipe Arizmendi Esquivel	Bishop of Tapachula; 16 July 2001 – 11 September 2004	Succeeded by Leopoldo González González
Preceded by José Luis Chávez Botello	Bishop of Tuxtla Gutiérrez; 11 September 2004 – 25 November 2006	
New title	Archbishop of Tuxtla Gutiérrez; 25 November 2006 – 3 October 2012	Succeeded by Fabio Martinez Castilla
Preceded by Francisco Robles Ortega	Archbishop of Monterrey; 3 October 2012 – present	Incumbent
