= Carlos Garfias Merlos =

Mexican prelate of the Catholic Church (1951–2026)

- Archbishop Emeritus of Morelia
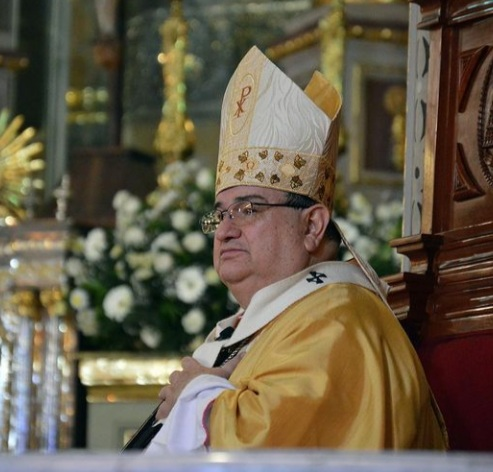
- Church: Catholic
- Archdiocese: Morelia
- Appointed: 2 November 2016
- Retired: 19 January 2026
- Predecessor: Alberto Suárez Inda
- Successor: José Armando Álvarez Cano
- Previous posts: Bishop of Ciudad Altamirano (1996–2003); Bishop of Netzahualcóyotl (2003–2010); Archbishop of Acapulco (2010–2016)

Orders
- Ordination: 8 August 1964
- Consecration: 20 December 1985 by Girolamo Prigione

Personal details
- Born: 1 January 1951 Tuxpan, Michoacán, Mexico
- Died: 6 August 2026 (aged 75)
- Motto: Cristo es nuestra paz ('Christ is our peace')
- Coat of arms

Styles of Carlos Garfias Merlos
- Reference style: His Excellency; The Most Reverend
- Spoken style: Your Excellency
- Religious style: Archbishop

Carlos Garfias Merlos (1 January 1951 – 6 August 2026) was a Mexican prelate of the Catholic Church who was Archbishop of Morelia from 2016 to 2026, after which he retired as archbishop emeritus.

== Biography ==
Carlos Garfias Merlos was born in Tuxpan, Michoacán, on 1 January 1951.

He studied humanities, philosophy and theology at the Seminary of Morelia. He earned a masters and a doctorate in psychotherapy and spirituality at the Universidad Intercontinental in Mexico City.

On 23 November 1975, he was ordained a priest for the Archdiocese of Morelia.

On 24 June 1996, Pope John Paul II named him Bishop of Ciudad Altamirado and he received his episcopal consecration on 25 July from Apostolic Nuncio Girolamo Prigione and Archbishops Rafael Bello Ruiz and Alberto Suárez Inda.

Within the Episcopal Conference of Mexico (ECM), he was president of the Episcopal Commission for Youth Pastoral Care from 1997 to 2000 and a member of its Family Pastoral Commission and spokesperson for the Southern Region.

On 8 July 2003, Pope John Paul II transferred him to the Diocese of Netzahualcóyotl and he was installed there on 22 August.

From 2004 to 2006 he was a member of the ECM Commissions on Clergy and on Family Pastoral Care. From 2007 to 2009 he was charged with responsibility for the aspect of labor on its Commission for Societal Pastoral Care.

On 7 June 2010, Pope Benedict XVI appointed him Archbishop of Acapulco. He received the pallium from Benedict in Rome on 29 June and was installed in Acapulco on 22 July.

From 2016 to 2018 he served on the President's Council of the ECM.

On 5 November 2016, Pope Francis named him Archbishop of Morelia. He was installed on 18 January 2017 and received his pallium from Francis on 29 June. In November 2018, he was elected vice-president of the ECM.

Garfias Merlos retired on 19 January 2026. He died seven months later, on 6 August 2026, at the age of 75.

Catholic Church titles
Preceded by José Raúl Vera López	Bishop of Ciudad Altamirado; 1996–2003	Succeeded by José Miguel Ángel Giles Vázquez
Preceded by José María Hernández González	Bishop of Netzahualcóyotl; 2003–2010	Succeeded by Héctor Luis Morales Sánchez
Preceded by Felipe Aguirre Franco	Archbishop of Acapulco; 2010–2016	Succeeded by Leopoldo González González
Preceded by Alberto Suárez Inda	Archbishop of Morelia; 2016–2026	Succeeded by José Armando Álvarez Cano
