= Archdiocese of Morelia =

Latin Catholic jurisdiction in Mexico

Coordinates: 19.7024°N 101.1920°W

Archdiocese of Morelia Archidioecesis Moreliensis Arquidiócesis de Morelia
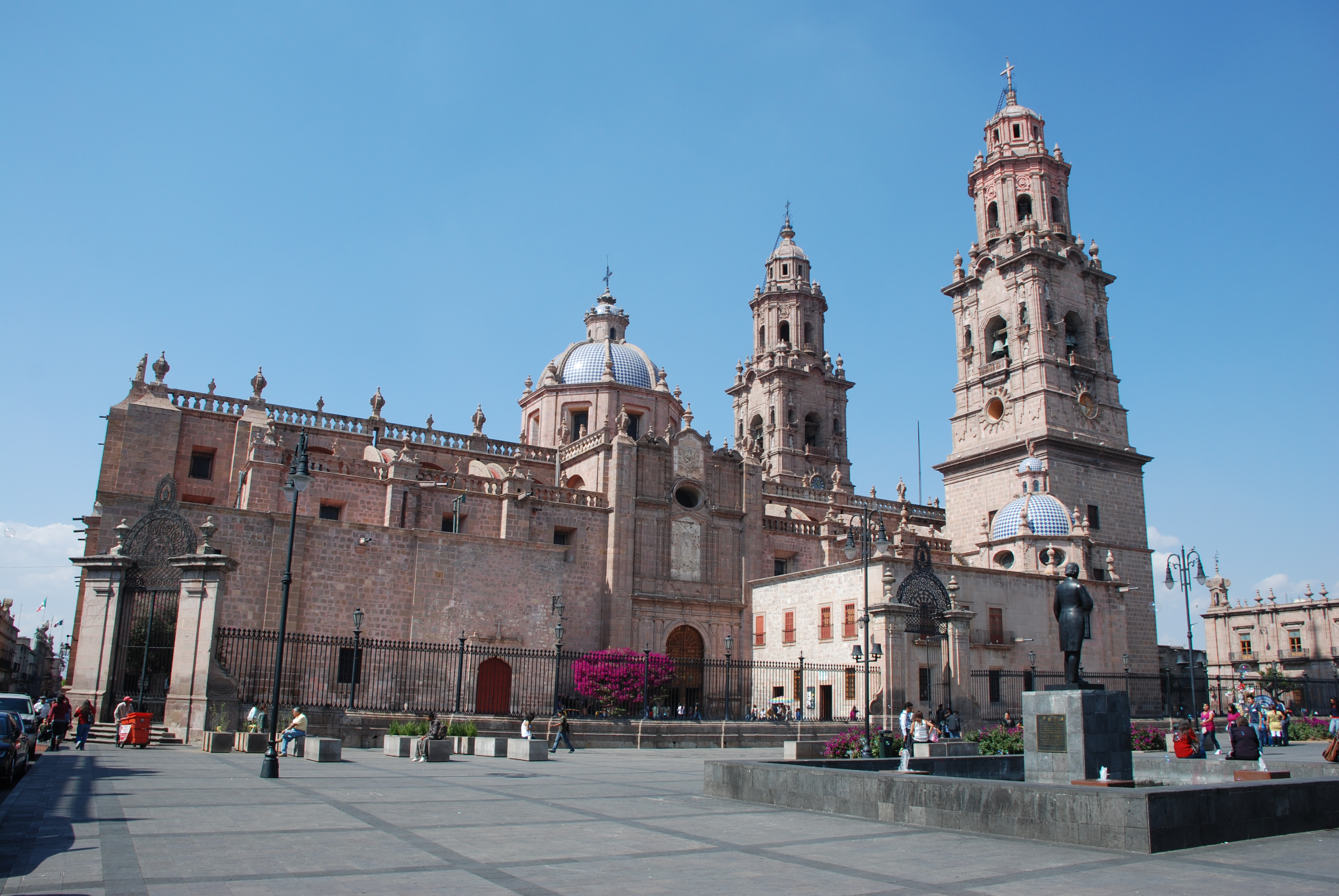
- Catedral de San Salvador

Location
- Country: Mexico
- Ecclesiastical province: Morelia

Statistics
- Area: 6,952 sq mi (18,010 km^{2})
- Population: Total; Catholics: (as of 2013); 2,612,360; 2,455,618 (94%)
- Parishes: 236

Information
- Denomination: Catholic Church
- Sui iuris church: Latin Church
- Rite: Roman Rite
- Established: 11 August 1536 (490 years ago)
- Cathedral: Cathedral of the Transfiguration, Morelia, Michoacán, Mexico

Current leadership
- Pope: Leo XIV
- Archbishop: José Armando Álvarez Cano
- Bishops emeritus: Alberto Suárez Inda (archbishop); Octavio Villegas Aguilar (auxiliary); Carlos Suárez Cázares (auxiliary)

Map

The Archdiocese of Morelia (Latin: Archidioecesis Moreliensis) is a Latin Church ecclesiastical territory or archdiocese of the Catholic Church in western central Mexico. It was erected on 11 August 1536 as the Diocese of Michoacán.

The cathedra is found in the Cathedral of the Transfiguration in the episcopal see of Morelia, capital of Michoacán state. It also has a minor basilica: Basílica de Nuestra Señora de la Salud, in Pátzcuaro, Michoacán de Ocampo.

== History ==
- It was established on 11 August 1536 as Diocese of Michoacán, on territory split off from the then Diocese of México.
- It lost territory repeatedly: on 13 July 1548 to establish the then Diocese of Guadalajara, on 15 Dec 1777 to establish the Diocese of Linares and on 31 Aug 1854 to establish the Diocese of San Luis Potosí.
- It was raised to the rank of Metropolitan Archdiocese of Michoacán by Pope Pius IX on 26 January 1863, having lost territory to establish the Diocese of León and the Diocese of Querétaro.
- It lost territory again on 16 Mar 1863 to establish the Diocese of Chilapa and on 26 Jul 1913 to establish the Diocese of Tacámbaro
- It was renamed to the Archdiocese of Morelia after its see on 22 November 1924.
- It lost territory again on 13 Oct 1973 to establish the Diocese of Celaya and on 2004 to establish the Diocese of Irapuato
- In January 2015, Pope Francis created Morelia's archbishop, Alberto Suárez Inda, the archdiocese's first Cardinal. According to an Associated Press story, Suárez Inda "has helped mediate political conflicts and kidnappings in one of Mexico's most violence-plagued states."

== Bishops ==
=== Episcopal ordinaries ===
Bishops of Michoacán

- Vasco de Quiroga (1536.08.18 – death 1565.03.14)
- Antonio Ruíz de Morales y Molina (1566.05.15 – 1572.12.10), later Bishop of Puebla de los Angeles (Mexico) (1572.12.10 – death 1576.07.17)
- Juan de Medina Rincón y de la Vega, Order of St. Augustine (O.S.A.) (1574.06.18 – death 1588.06.30)
- Alfonso Guerra, Dominican Order (O.P.) (1592.03.17 – death 1596.06.18), previously Bishop of Paraguay (Paraguay) (1579.02.06 – 1592.03.17)
- Domingo de Ulloa, O.P. (1598.04.03 – death 1601), previously Bishop of Roman Catholic Diocese of León in Nicaragua (Nicaragua) (1585.02.04 – 1591.12.09), Bishop of Popayán (Colombia) (1591.12.09 – 1598.04.03)
- Andrés de Ubilla, O.P. (1603.01.29 – death 1603.05), previously Bishop of Chiapas (Mexico) (1592.05.21 – 1603.01.29)
- Juan Fernández de Rosillo (1603.06.16 – death 1606.10.29), previously Bishop of Vera Paz (Guatemala) (1592.06.12 – 1603.06.16)
- Baltazar de Cobarrubias y Múñoz, O.S.A. (1608.02.04 – death 1622.07.22), previously Bishop of Paraguay (Paraguay) (1601 – 1603.01.13), Bishop of Nueva Caceres (Philippines) (1603.01.13 – 1605.06.06), Bishop of Antequera (Mexico) (1605.06.06 – 1608.02.04)
- Alonso Orozco Enriquez de Armendáriz Castellanos y Toledo, Mercedarians (O. de M.) (1624.04.15 – death 1628.12.05), previously Titular Bishop of Sidon (1605.06.27 – 1610.08.30) & Auxiliary Bishop of Burgos (Spain) (1605.06.27 – 1610.08.30), then Bishop of Santiago (Cuba) (1610.08.30 – 1624.04.15)
- Francisco de Rivera y Pareja, O. de M. (1629.09.17 – death 1637.09.05), previously Bishop of Guadalajara (Mexico) (1618.01.29 – 1629.09.17)
- Marcos Ramírez de Prado y Ovando, Friars Minor (O.F.M.) (1639.05.30 – 1666.12.15), previously Bishop of Chiapas (Mexico) (1633.01.31 – 1639.05.30); later Metropolitan Archbishop of México (Mexico) (1666.12.15 – death 1667.05.14)
- Payo Enríquez de Rivera Manrique, O.S.A. (1668.01.16 – 1668.09.17), previously Bishop of Guatemala (Guatemala) (1657 – 1668.01.16); later Metropolitan Archbishop of México (Mexico) (1668.09.17 – retired 1681.06.30)
- Francisco Antonio Sarmiento de Luna y Enríquez, O.S.A. (1668.12.12 – 1673.09.25), later Bishop of Almería (Spain) (1673.09.25 – 1675.05.27), Bishop of Coria (Spain) (1675.05.27 – 1683.07.21)
- Francisco Verdín y Molina (1673.11.27 – death 1675.04.29), previously Bishop of Guadalajara (Mexico) (1665.07.06 – 1673.11.27)
- Francisco de Aguiar y Seijas y Ulloa (1677.08.30 – 1680), later Metropolitan Archbishop of México (Mexico) (1680 – death 1698.08.14)
- Antonio de Monroy, O.P. (1680 – 1680), previously Master (superior general) of the Order of Preachers (Dominicans) (1677 – 1686); later Metropolitan Archbishop of Santiago de Compostela (Spain) (1685.07.10 – death 7 Nov 1715)
- Juan de Ortega Cano Montañez y Patiño (1682.06.08 – 21 Jun 1700), previously Bishop of Durango (Mexico) (1674.04.16 – 1675.09.09), Bishop of Guatemala (Guatemala) (1675.09.09 – 1682.06.08); later Metropolitan Archbishop of México (Mexico) (21 Jun 1700 – 16 Dec 1708)
- García Felipe de Legazpi y Velasco Altamirano y Albornoz (5 Mar 1700 – 14 Jan 1704), previously Bishop of Durango (Mexico) (1691.08.23 – 5 Mar 1700); later Bishop of Puebla de los Angeles (Mexico) (14 Jan 1704 – death 1705.12)
- Manuel de Escalante Colombres y Mendoza (31 May 1704 – death 15 May 1708), previously Bishop of Durango (Mexico) (1699 – 31 May 1704)
- Felipe Ignacio Trujillo y Guerrero (22 May 1713 – death 6 Feb 1721)
- Francisco de la Cuesta, Brothers Hospitallers of St. John of God (O.S.H.) (23 Sep 1723 – death 30 May 1724), previously Metropolitan Archbishop of Manila (Philippines) (28 Apr 1704 – 23 Sep 1723); Archbishop (personal title)
- Juan José de Escalona y Calatayud (15 Nov 1728 – death 23 May 1737), previously Bishop of Caracas (Venezuela) (15 Mar 1717 – 15 Nov 1728)
- José Félix Valverde (24 Nov 1738 – death 23 Feb 1741), Bishop of Caracas (Venezuela) (15 Nov 1728 – 24 Nov 1738)
- Francisco Pablo Matos Coronado (2 Jan 1741 – death 26 Apr 1744), previously Bishop of Yucatán (Mexico) (9 Jul 1734 – 2 Jan 1741)
- Martín de Elizacoechea (8 Mar 1745 – death 19 Nov 1756), previously Bishop of Durango (Mexico) (27 Jul 1735 – 8 Mar 1745)
- Pedro Anselmo Sánchez de Tagle (26 Sep 1757 – death 27 May 1772), previously Bishop of Durango (Mexico) (10 Apr 1747 – 26 Sep 1757)
- Luis Fernando de Hoyos y Mier (12 Jul 1773 – death 7 May 1776)
- Juan Ignacio de la Rocha (3 Feb 1782 – death 3 Feb 1782)
- Francisco Antonio de San Miguel Iglesias y Cajiga, O.S.H. (15 Dec 1783 – death 18 Jun 1804), previously Bishop of Comayagua (Honduras) (17 Feb 1777 – 15 Dec 1783)
- Marcos de Moriana y Zafrilla (26 Jun 1805 – death 27 Jul 1809)
- Father Manuel Abad y Queipo (1811 – 1811, not consecrated bishop)
- Juan Cayetano José María Gómez de Portugal y Solis (28 Feb 1831 – death 4 Apr 1850), previously Titular Bishop of Claudiopolis in Isauria (19 Oct 1830 – 28 Feb 1831)
- Clemente de Jesús Munguía y Núñez (3 Oct 1850 – 26 Jan 1863 see below)

Metropolitan Archbishops of Michoacán

- Clemente de Jesús Munguía y Núñez (see above 26 Jan 1863 – death 14 Dec 1868)
- José Ignacio Árciga Ruiz de Chávez (21 Dec 1868 – death 7 Jan 1900), succeeding as former auxiliary bishop of Michoacán (4 Mar 1866 – 21 Dec 1868) & Titular Bishop of Lagania (4 Mar 1866 – 21 Dec 1868)
- Atenógenes Silva y Álvarez Tostado (21 Aug 1900 – death 26 Feb 1911), previously Bishop of Colima (Mexico) (11 Jul 1892 – 21 Aug 1900)
- Leopoldo Ruiz y Flóres (27 Nov 1911 – 22 Nov 1924), previously Bishop of León in Mexico (Mexico) (12 Nov 1900 – 14 Sep 1907), Metropolitan Archbishop of Linares (Mexico) (14 Sep 1907 – 27 Nov 1911)

Archbishops of Morelia

- Leopoldo Ruiz y Flóres (22 Nov 1924 – 12 Dec 1941), also Apostolic Delegate (papal diplomatic envoy) to Mexico (1929 – 1937)
- Luis María Altamirano y Bulnes (12 Dec 1941 – death 7 Feb 1970), previously Bishop of Huajuapan de León (Mexico) (3 Aug 1923 – 13 Mar 1933), Bishop of Tulancingo (Mexico) (13 Mar 1933 – 1 May 1937), Titular Archbishop of Bizya (1 May 1937 – 12 Dec 1941)& Coadjutor Archbishop of Morelia (1 May 1937 – 12 Dec 1941), succeeding as such
- Manuel Martín del Campo y Padilla (7 Feb 1970 – death 6 Apr 1972), previously Titular Bishop of Aulon (3 Aug 1946 – 26 Dec 1948), Coadjutor Bishop of León (3 Aug 1946 – 26 Dec 1948), succeeding as Bishop of León in Mexico (Mexico) (26 Dec 1948 – 10 Jun 1965), Titular Archbishop of Vadesi (10 Jun 1965 – 7 Feb 1970) & Coadjutor Archbishop of Morelia (10 Jun 1965 – 7 Feb 1970) succeeded as such
- Estanislao Alcaraz y Figueroa (3 Jul 1972 – retired 20 Jan 1995), previously Bishop of Matamoros (Mexico) (20 Jan 1959 – 3 Mar 1968), Bishop of San Luis Potosí (Mexico) (3 Mar 1968 – 3 Jul 1972)
- Alberto Suárez Inda (20 Jan 1995 – retired 5 Nov 2016), previously Bishop of Tacámbaro (Mexico) (5 Nov 1985 – 20 Jan 1995); created Cardinal-Priest of S. Policarpo (14 Feb 2015 [11 Oct 2015] – ...)
- Carlos Garfias Merlos (5 Nov 2016 – 19 Jan 2026), previously Archbishop of Acapulco
- José Armando Álvarez Cano (since 19 Jan 2026)

=== Coadjutor bishops ===
- Luis María Martínez y Rodríguez (1933–1937); did not succeed to see; appointed Archbishop of México, Federal District
- Luis María Altamirano y Bulnes (1937–1941)
- Manuel Martín del Campo Padilla (1965–1970)
- José Armando Álvarez Cano (2025–2026)

=== Auxiliary bishops ===
- Benito María de Moxó y Francolí O.S.B. (1803–1805), appointed Archbishop of La Plata o Charcas, Bolivia
- José Antonio de la Peña y Navarro (1862–1863), appointed Bishop of Zamora, Michoacán
- José Ignacio Árciga Ruiz de Chávez (1866–1868), appointed Archbishop here
- Luis María Martínez y Rodríguez (1923–1934), appointed Coadjutor here
- Salvador Martinez Silva (1951–1969)
- José de Jesús Tirado Pedraza (1963–1965), appointed Bishop of Ciudad Victoria, Tamaulipas
- Román Acevedo Rojas (1967–1983)
- Leopoldo González González (1999–2005), appointed Bishop of Tapachula, Chiapas
- Francisco Moreno Barrón (2002–2008), appointed Bishop of Tlaxcala
- Octavio Villegas Aguilar (2005–2015)
- Carlos Suárez Cázares (2008–
- Juan Espinoza Jiménez (2010–
- Herculano Medina Garfias (2015–
- Víctor Alejandro Aguilar Ledesma (2016–

=== Other priests of this diocese who became bishops ===
- Luis María Altamirano y Bulnes, appointed Bishop of Apatzingán, Michoacán in 1962
- Juan Jesús Cardinal Posadas Ocampo, appointed Bishop of Tijuana, Baja California Norte in 1970; future Cardinal
- Alejo Zavala Castro, appointed Bishop of Tlapa, Guerrero in 1992
- Rodrigo Aguilar Martínez, appointed Bishop of Matehuala, San Luís Potosí in 1997
- Enrique Díaz Díaz, appointed Auxiliary Bishop of San Cristóbal de Las Casas, Chiapas in 2003

== Province ==
Its ecclesiastical province comprises the Metropolitan's own archdiocese and the following suffragan bishoprics:

- Roman Catholic Diocese of Apatzingan
- Roman Catholic Diocese of Ciudad Lázaro Cárdenas
- Roman Catholic Diocese of Tacámbaro
- Roman Catholic Diocese of Zamora in Mexico.

== See also ==
- List of Roman Catholic dioceses in Mexico
