= Diocese of Tacámbaro =

Latin Catholic jurisdiction in Mexico

Diocese of Tacámbaro Dioecesis Tacambarensis Diócesis de Tacámbaro

Location
- Country: Mexico
- Ecclesiastical province: Province of Morelia

Statistics
- Area: 5,648 sq mi (14,630 km^{2})
- Population: Total; Catholics: (as of 2006); 362,000; 346,000 (95.6%)
- Parishes: 41

Information
- Denomination: Catholic Church
- Sui iuris church: Latin Church
- Rite: Roman Rite
- Established: 26 July 1913 (112 years ago)
- Cathedral: Cathedral of St. Jerome

Current leadership
- Pope: Leo XIV
- Bishop: Juan Carlos Arcq Guzmán
- Metropolitan Archbishop: José Armando Álvarez Cano

Map
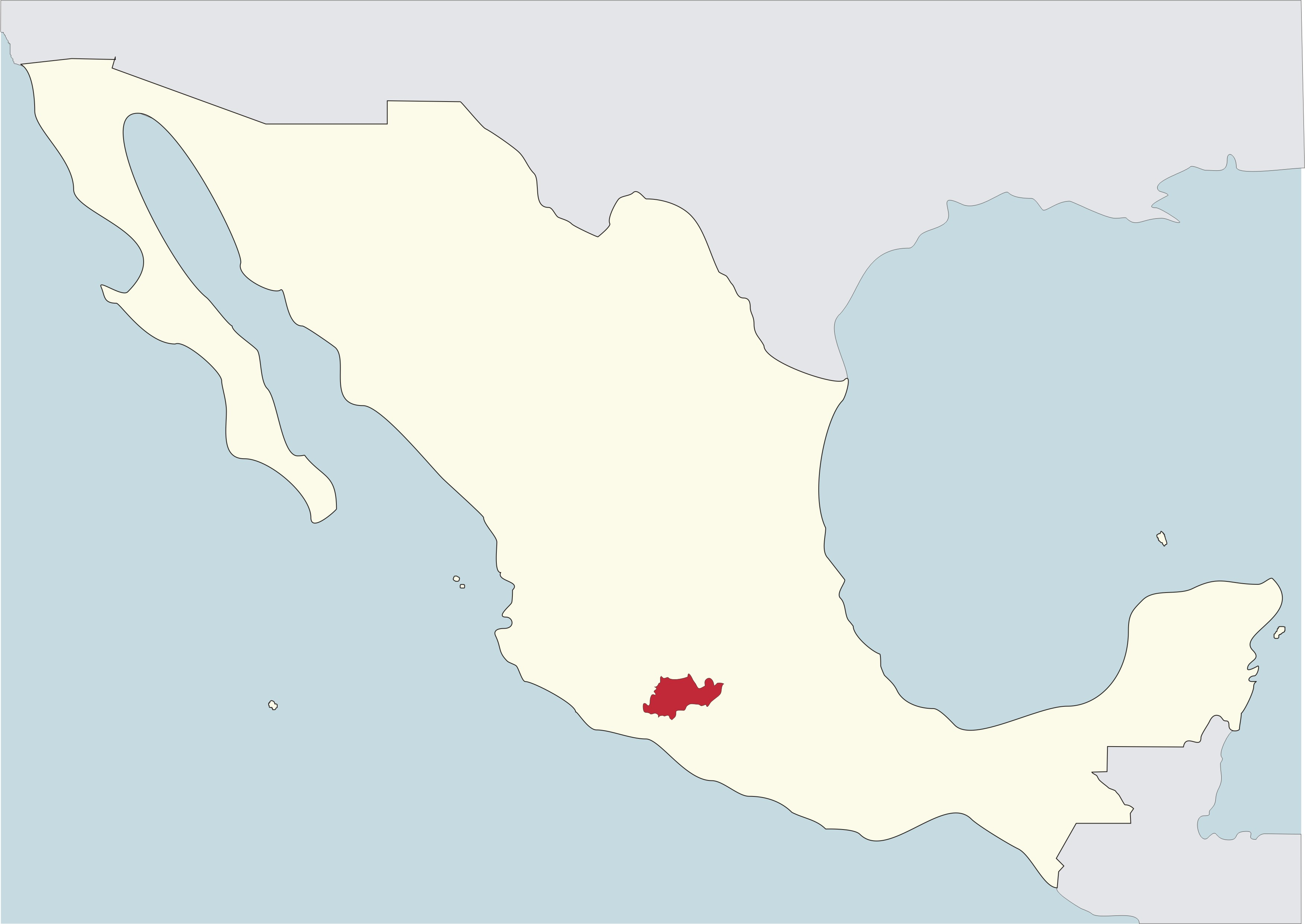

Website
- www.diocesisdetacambaro.mx

The Diocese of Tacámbaro (Latin: Dioecesis Tacambarensis) is a Latin Church ecclesiastical territory or diocese of the Catholic Church. The diocese is a suffragan in the ecclesiastical province of the metropolitan Archdiocese of Morelia. The diocese was erected on 26 July 1913. Its cathedra is found within Cathedral of St. Jerome, in the episcopal see of Tacámbaro, Michoacán.

== Bishops ==
=== Ordinaries ===
- Leopoldo Lara y Torres (1920 – 1933), resigned
- Manuel Pío López Estrada (1934 – 1939), appointed Bishop of Veracruz-Jalapa
- José Abraham Martínez Betancourt (1940 – 1979), retired
- Luis Morales Reyes (1979 – 1985), appointed Coadjutor Bishop of Torreón, Coahuila
- Alberto Suárez Inda (1985 – 1995), appointed Archbishop of Morelia, Michoacán
- Rogelio Cabrera López (1996 – 2001), appointed Bishop of Tapachula, Chiapas
- José Luis Castro Medellín, M.S.F. (2002 – 2014), retired
- Gerardo Díaz Vázquez (2014 – 2023), appointed Bishop of Colima
- Juan Carlos Arcq Guzmán (2024 – Present)

=== Auxiliary bishop ===
- Luis Morales Reyes (1976-1979), appointed Bishop here

=== Other priests of this diocese who became bishops ===
- Eduardo Cirilo Carmona Ortega (priest here, 1983-1991), appointed Bishop of Puerto Escondido, Oaxaca in 2003
- Joel Ocampo Gorostieta, appointed Bishop of Ciudad Altamirano, Guerrero in 2019

== Territorial losses ==
Year	Along with	To form
1962	Diocese of Colima	Diocese of Apatzingan
1964	Diocese of Acapulco; Diocese of Chilapa; Diocese of Toluca	Diocese of Ciudad Altamirano

== Episcopal See ==
- Tacámbaro, Michoacán

== External links and references ==
- "Diocese of Tacámbaro". Catholic-Hierarchy.
