= Felipe Aguirre Franco =

Mexican Roman Catholic archbishop (born 1934)

His Excellency Felipe Aguirre Franco
- Archbishop Emeritus of Acapulco
- Church: Roman Catholic Church
- Archdiocese: Acapulco
- Appointed: 30 June 2000
- Installed: 8 May 2001
- Term ended: 7 June 2010
- Predecessor: Rafael Bello Ruiz
- Successor: Carlos Garfias Merlos
- Other post: Titular bishop of Otriculum (1974–1988)

Orders
- Ordination: 22 March 1958 by José Garibi Rivera
- Consecration: 25 April 1974 by Mario Pio Gaspari

Personal details
- Born: 4 February 1934 (age 92) Encarnación de Díaz, Jalisco, Mexico
- Education: Seminary of St. Joseph in Guadalajara
- Motto: Evangelizar

Felipe Aguirre Franco (born 4 February 1934) is a Mexican Roman Catholic prelate who served as the archbishop of Acapulco from 2001 to 2010. He previously served as bishop of Tuxtla Gutiérrez from 1988 to 2000 and as auxiliary bishop of the diocese from 1974 to 1988. He has been archbishop emeritus of Acapulco since his retirement in 2010.

== Early life and priesthood ==
Aguirre Franco was born in Encarnación de Díaz, Jalisco, on 4 February 1934, to Inocencio Aguirre and Teresa Franco. He attended the Colegio Felipe Ramírez in his hometown and subsequently studied humanities and Latin at seminaries in Lagos de Moreno and San Juan de los Lagos. From 1948 to 1957 he completed studies in humanities, philosophy and theology at the Seminary of St. Joseph in Guadalajara.

He was ordained a priest for the Archdiocese of Guadalajara on 22 March 1958 by Archbishop José Garibi Rivera. He subsequently served as a teacher and prefect in several seminaries in Jalisco, including those in Totatiche, Guadalajara and Tapalpa. In 1971 he became parish priest of Santa Mónica in La Barca, and in 1972 moved to Tuxtla Gutiérrez to serve as parish priest of the cathedral.

== Episcopate ==
On 12 March 1974, Aguirre Franco was appointed titular bishop of Otriculum and auxiliary bishop of Tuxtla Gutiérrez. The appointment was recorded in the Acta Apostolicae Sedis; the Holy See described him as a priest of the Archdiocese of Guadalajara and parish priest of the cathedral in Tuxtla Gutiérrez. He was consecrated a bishop on 25 April 1974, with Archbishop Mario Pio Gaspari as principal consecrator and Bishops Francisco Javier Nuño y Guerrero and José Trinidad Sepúlveda Ruiz-Velasco as principal co-consecrators.

As auxiliary bishop, Aguirre Franco served from 1974 to 1988. During this period he coordinated the diocesan lay apostolate, founded and directed the Semanario Católico, assisted the Movimiento de Encuentro Matrimonial, and participated in commissions of the Mexican Episcopal Conference and the Latin American Episcopal Conference.

=== Bishop of Tuxtla Gutiérrez ===
On 28 April 1988, Aguirre Franco was appointed bishop of Tuxtla Gutiérrez, succeeding José Trinidad Sepúlveda Ruiz-Velasco. He took canonical possession of the diocese on 29 June 1988.

During his episcopate, he promoted diocesan pastoral planning, the formation of priests and laypeople, religious life, liturgical music and priestly vocations. He founded the major seminary and introductory course and oversaw construction of a new diocesan seminary.

Aguirre Franco received Pope John Paul II during the pope's pastoral visit to Chiapas on 11 May 1990. He later recalled the visit and its significance for the indigenous population of Chiapas in a 2016 interview.

From 1990 to 1997 he served as president of the Mexican Episcopal Commission for Indigenous Pastoral. From 1995 to 1999 he was founder and president of the CELAM Secretariat for Indigenous Pastoral (SEPAI). He also served on the Commission for Reconciliation and Peace in Chiapas from 1994 to 2000 and was a co-founder of the religious congregation Disciples of Jesus the Good Shepherd.

== Archbishop of Acapulco ==
On 30 June 2000, Pope John Paul II appointed Aguirre Franco coadjutor archbishop of Acapulco. He took canonical possession as coadjutor on 28 September 2000.

On 8 May 2001, following the resignation of Archbishop Rafael Bello Ruiz, Aguirre Franco succeeded him as archbishop of Acapulco. He received the pallium from John Paul II on 29 June 2001.

As archbishop, he promoted diocesan pastoral planning, strengthened diocesan councils and the presbyterate, supported the construction of the new Cathedral of Christ the King, encouraged the presence of religious congregations, and promoted lay formation, seminary work and vocational ministry. He also founded the weekly newspaper Mar Adentro.

From 19 February 2005 to 14 February 2006, Aguirre Franco additionally served as apostolic administrator of the Diocese of Chilpancingo-Chilapa.

== Retirement ==
On 7 June 2010, Pope Benedict XVI accepted Aguirre Franco's resignation as metropolitan archbishop of Acapulco and appointed Carlos Garfias Merlos as his successor.

In a 2016 interview, Aguirre Franco was described as archbishop emeritus of Acapulco and reflected on his years as bishop of Tuxtla Gutiérrez, including the 1990 visit of John Paul II and pastoral work among indigenous communities in Chiapas.
