= Diocese of Tapachula =

Roman Catholic diocese in Mexico

Diocese of Tapachula Dioecesis Tapacolensis Diócesis de Tapachula

Location
- Country: Mexico
- Ecclesiastical province: Province of Tuxtla Gutiérrez
- Metropolitan: Tapachula, Chiapas

Statistics
- Area: 12,245 km^{2} (4,728 sq mi)
- Population: Total; Catholics: (as of 2023); 1,151,198; 610,135 (53.0%)
- Parishes: 53

Information
- Denomination: Catholic Church
- Sui iuris church: Latin Church
- Rite: Roman Rite
- Established: 19 June 1957; 69 years ago
- Cathedral: Cathedral of St. Joseph
- Secular priests: 109 (101 diocesan, 8 religious orders)

Current leadership
- Pope: Leo XIV
- Bishop: Luis Manuel López Alfaro
- Metropolitan Archbishop: José Francisco González González

Map

Website
- www.diocesisdetapachula.com

The Roman Catholic Diocese of Tapachula (Latin: Dioecesis Tapacolensis) is a Latin rite suffragan diocese of the Metropolitan Archdiocese of Tuxtla Gutiérrez.

Its cathedral Episcopal see is the Catedral de San José, dedicated to Saint Joseph, in Tapachula, Chiapas. Its bishop is Luis Manuel López Alfaro.

== History ==
It was erected on 19 June 1957 as Diocese of Tapachula / Tapacolen(sis) (Latin), on territory split off from the Diocese of Chiapas and suffragan of the Metropolitan Archdiocese of Antequera, Oaxaca until 25 November 2006.

== Statistics ==
As of 2023, it pastorally served 610,135 Catholics (53.0% of 1,151,198 total) on 12,245 km^{2} in 53 parishes 109 priests (101 diocesan, 8 religious) and 119 lay religious (8 brothers, 111 sisters).

== Episcopal Ordinaries ==
Suffragan Bishops of Tapachula

- Adolfo Hernández Hurtado (1958.01.13 – 1970.09.06), appointed Bishop of Zamora in Mexico
- Bartolomé Carrasco Briseño (1971.06.11 – 1976.06.11), appointed Archbishop of Antequera, Oaxaca
- Juvenal Porcayo Uribe (1976.07.03 – death 1983.06.30)
- Luis Miguel Cantón Marín (1984.03.30 – death 1990.05.10)
- Felipe Arizmendi Esquivel (1991.02.07 – 2000.03.31), appointed Bishop of San Cristóbal de Las Casas
- Rogelio Cabrera López (2001.07.16 – 2004.09.11), appointed Bishop of Tuxtla Gutiérrez
- Leopoldo González González (2005.06.09 – 2017.06.30), appointed Archbishop of Acapulco
- Jaime Calderón Calderón (2018.07.07 – 2024.07.04), appointed Archbishop of León
- Luis Manuel López Alfaro (2025.04.09 – Present)

== See also ==
- List of Catholic dioceses in Mexico

== Sources and external links and references ==
- GCatholic - data for all sections
- "Diocese of Tapachula". Catholic-Hierarchy.
