= San Policarpo =

San Policarpo may refer to:

- Saint Polycarp

Places and jurisdictions

- San Policarpo all'Acquedotto Claudio, titular and parochial church in Rome, for a cardinal-priest
- San Policarpo, Eastern Samar
