= Roman Catholic Diocese of León =

Roman Catholic Diocese of León may refer to the following Latin Catholic ecclesiastical jurisdictions :

- Roman Catholic Diocese of León in Spain
- Roman Catholic Diocese of León in Nicaragua
- Roman Catholic Diocese of León in Mexico, former; now a Metropolitan archbishopric
