= Jaime Calderón Calderón =

American prelate of the Catholic Church (born 1949)

Coordinates: 21.1243°N 101.6820°W

His Excellency, The Most Reverend Jaime Calderón Calderón
- Archbishop of León
- Church: Catholic Church; Latin Church
- Archdiocese: León
- Appointed: July 4, 2024
- Installed: August 19, 2024
- Predecessor: Alfonso Cortés Contreras
- Previous posts: Bishop of the Tapachula in Chiapas (2018‍–‍2024); Auxiliary Bishop of Zamora (2012‍–‍2018)

Personal details
- Born: Jaime Calderón Calderón; May 1, 1966 (age 60) Churintzio, Michoacán, Mexico
- Motto: Trusting in you, lord (Proverbs 3:5–6)

Ordination history
History
Priestly ordination
- Ordained by: José Esaul Robles Jiménez
Episcopal consecration
- Principal consecrator: Christophe Pierre
- Co-consecrators: Gabriel Montalvo Higuera, José Esaul Robles Jiménez
Episcopal succession
Bishops consecrated by Jaime Calderón Calderón as principal consecrator
- Christophe Pierre: 2015

Jaime Calderón Calderón (born May 1, 1966) is a Mexican philosopher and cleric who served as Auxiliary Bishop of the Diocese of Zamora. On July 7, 2018, he was appointed by Pope Francis as Bishop of the Diocese of Tapachula. On July 4, 2024, he was appointed archbishop of the Archdiocese of León. He is also currently vice president of the Mexican Episcopal Conference for the three-year period 2024-2027, Conferencia del Episcopado Mexicano (C.E.M.).

== Life ==
Jaime Calderón Calderón was born in Churintzio, Michoacán, on May 1, 1966. He completed his basic studies in his hometown and then entered the Diocesan Seminary of Zamora to study secondary school and philosophy. He completed his theological baccalaureate at the UPM and was ordained a priest on February 16, 1991. He obtained a Bachelor's degree in Philosophy in 1994 with his thesis "Towards a philosophy of liberating education: Paulo Freire" at the UPM. He received his doctorate in Philosophy from the Pontifical Gregorian University in Rome with his dissertation "Freedom as the foundation of the configuration of personality in Xavier Xubiri" in 2002.

He was a professor of Philosophy at the Diocesan Seminary of Zamora and rector of the same institution between 2011 and 2013. He was Auxiliary Bishop of Zamora, Mich., elected by Pope Benedict XVI on July 5, 2012, and Titular of Iomnium. He was consecrated by the Apostolic Nuncio, Christophe Pierre, on October 5, 2012, who conferred upon him the episcopate together with José Luis Amezcua Melgoza, Bishop of Colima, and Javier Navarro Rodríguez, Bishop of Zamora. On July 7, 2018, Pope Francis appointed him bishop of the Diocese of Tapachula, taking possession of the diocese in September 2018.

On July 4, 2024, Pope Francis appointed him III Archbishop of León, taking possession of his Archdiocese on August 19, 2024, in front of thirty bishops and dozens of faithful.

== Work ==
- Towards a philosophy of liberating education: Paulo Freire, UPM, Mexico 1994.
- Freedom as the foundation of the configuration of personality in Xavier Xubiri, Pontificia Università Gregoriana Rome 2002.
- »How to speak of God to the man of today? : a challenge for the philosophy of the XXI / Proceedings of the III Colloquium of Philosophy of the UPM«, UPM, Mexico 2006. coord. Francisco Xavier Sánchez Hernández

== See also ==
- List of Roman Catholic archdioceses in México
- Roman Catholic Archdiocese of León
