= Alberto Suárez Inda =

Mexican cardinal (born 1939)

His Eminence Alberto Suárez Inda
- Cardinal; Archbishop Emeritus of Morelia
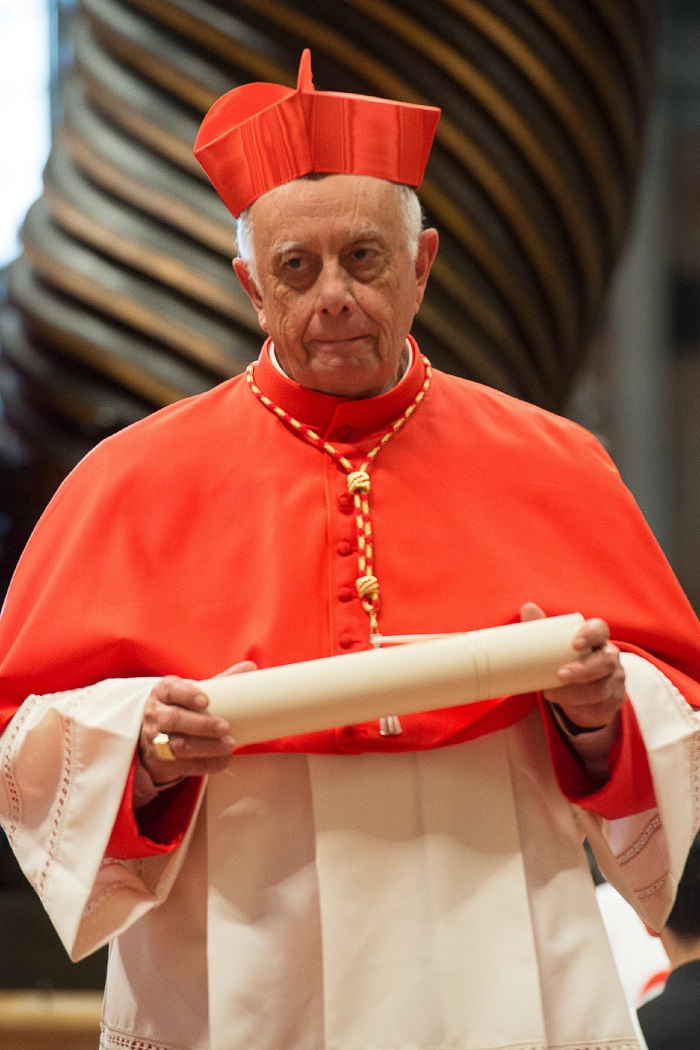
- Suárez Inda in 2015 upon being made a cardinal.
- Church: Roman Catholic Church
- Archdiocese: Morelia
- See: Morelia
- Appointed: 20 January 1995
- Installed: 24 February 1995
- Term ended: 5 November 2016
- Predecessor: Estanislao Alcaraz y Figueroa
- Successor: Carlos Garfias Merlos
- Other post: Cardinal-Priest of San Policarpo (2015-)
- Previous post: Bishop of Tacámbaro (1985-95)

Orders
- Ordination: 8 August 1964 by Luis María Altamirano y Bulnes
- Consecration: 20 December 1985 by Girolamo Prigione
- Created cardinal: 14 February 2015 by Pope Francis
- Rank: Cardinal-Priest

Personal details
- Born: Alberto Suárez Inda; 30 January 1939 (age 87) Celaya, Mexico
- Education: Pontifical Gregorian University; Pontifical Latin American College
- Motto: Vivimos Para El Señor (We live for the Lord)
- Coat of arms: Alberto Suárez Inda's coat of arms

Styles of Alberto Suarez Inda
- Reference style: His Eminence
- Spoken style: Your Eminence
- Religious style: Cardinal
- Informal style: Cardinal

Ordination history of Alberto Suárez Inda
History
Episcopal consecration
- Principal consecrator: Girolamo Prigione
- Co-consecrators: Estanislao Alcaraz y Figueroa; Luis Morales Reyes
Cardinalate
- Elevated by: Pope Francis
Episcopal succession
Bishops consecrated by Alberto Suárez Inda as principal consecrator
- Leopoldo González González: 19 May 1999
- Francisco Moreno Barrón: 20 March 2002
- Salvador Rangel Mendoza, O.F.M.: 5 June 2009
- Juan Espinoza Jimenéz: 22 February 2011
- Víctor Alejandro Aguilar Ledesma: 25 February 2016
- Herculano Medina Garfias: 25 February 2016

Alberto Suárez Inda (born 30 January 1939) is a Mexican prelate of the Roman Catholic Church. He served as Archbishop of Morelia from 1995 to 2016.

== Biography ==
Alberto Suárez Inda was born in Celaya in Mexico on 30 January 1939.

He studied humanities in Morelia and then attended the Pontifical Latin American College in Rome from 1958 until 1965. He was ordained to the priesthood on 8 August 1964 and began serving as a vicar in Morelia and in Pátzcuaro. He also taught before becoming a parish priest for a newly-established parish in his hometown. He later served as the rector for the minor seminary in Celaya from 1974 until his appointment to the episcopate in 1985 when Pope John Paul II named him as the Bishop of Tacámbaro. He received his episcopal consecration on the following 20 December. He became the Archbishop of Morela in 1995 and oversaw the institution of 40 new parish churches.

On 4 January 2015, following his weekly Angelus address, Pope Francis announced that he would make him a cardinal during a consistory to be held on 14 February. At that ceremony, he was assigned the titular church of San Policarpo. In April 2015 he was appointed a member of the Congregation for the Clergy and the Pontifical Council for Justice and Peace (the latter which was dissolved in 2016). He holds his membership in the former body until he turned 80 on 30 January 2019 at which point he also became ineligible to vote as an elector in a future papal conclave.

Pope Francis accepted his retirement from his archdiocese on 5 November 2016.

Catholic Church titles
Preceded by Luis Morales Reyes	Bishop of Tacambaro; 1985-1995	Succeeded by Rogelio Cabrera López
Preceded by Estanislao Alcaraz y Figueroa	Archbishop of Morelia; 1995 - 2016	Succeeded by Carlos Garfias Merlos
Preceded by None; titular church established	Cardinal Priest of San Policarpo	Incumbent
