= Archdiocese of Acapulco =

Catholic archdiocese in Mexico

Coordinates: 16.8491°N 99.9090°W

Archdiocese of Acapulco Archidioecesis Acapulcana Arquidiócesis de Acapulco
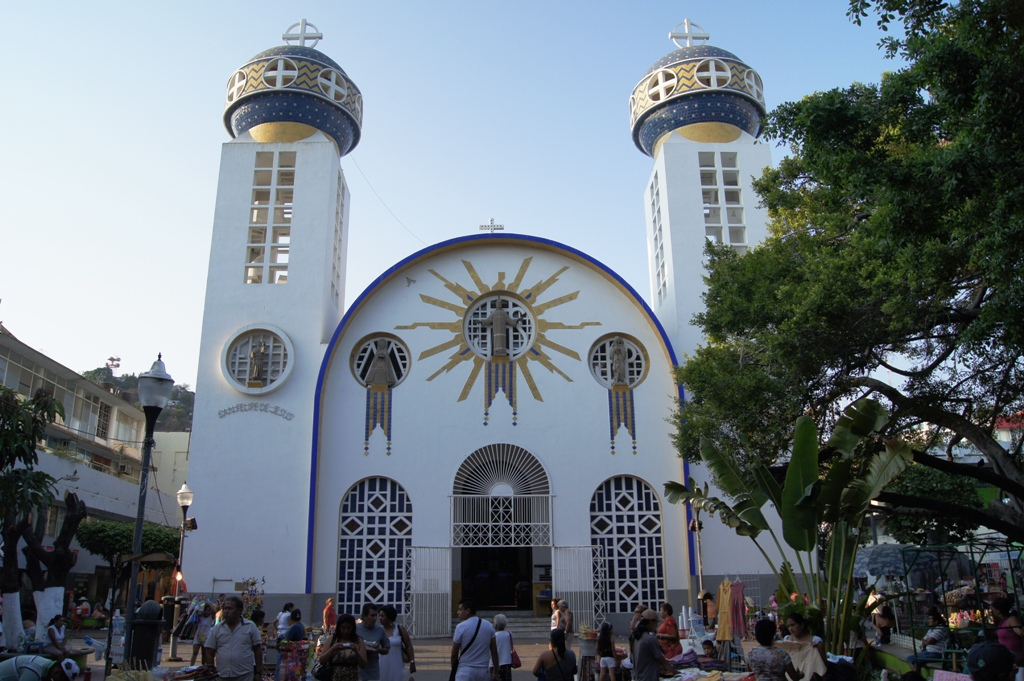
- Catedral de Nuestra Señora de la Soledad

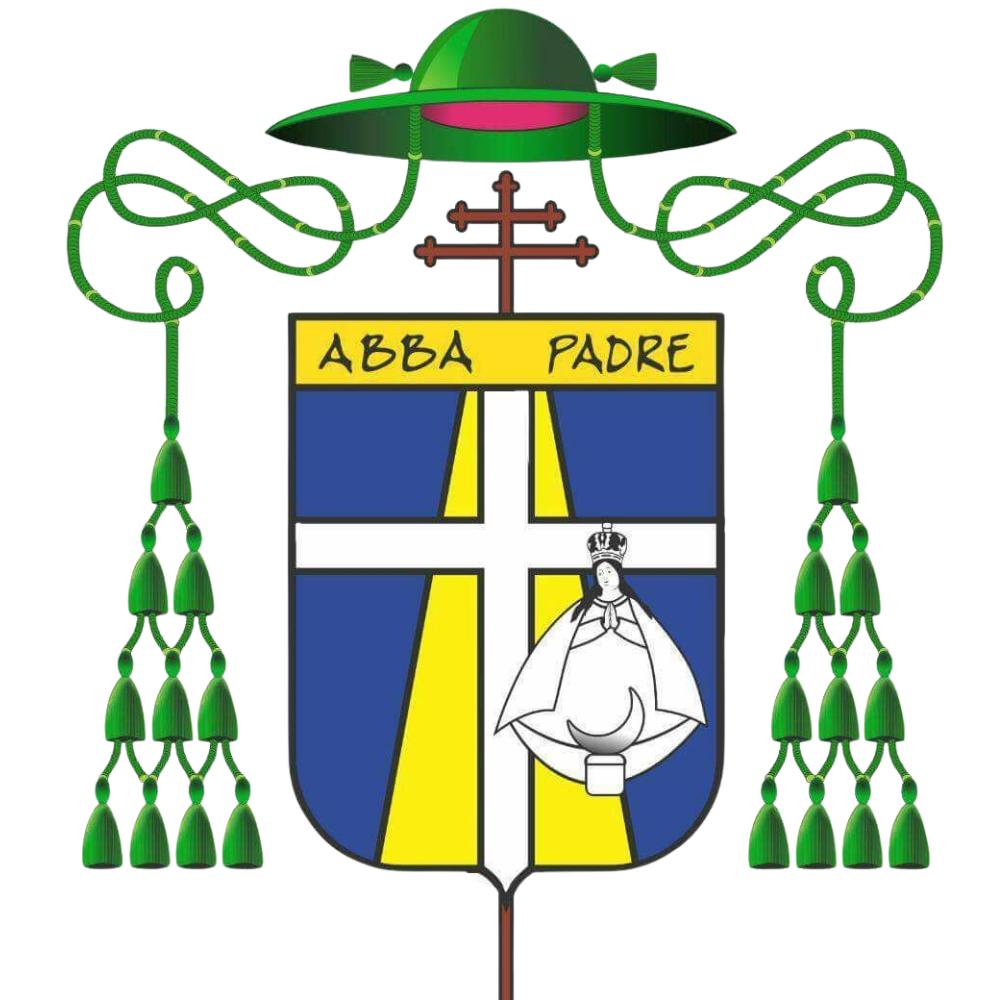

Location
- Country: Mexico
- Ecclesiastical province: Province of Acapulco

Statistics
- Area: 7,185 sq mi (18,610 km^{2})
- Population: Total; Catholics: (as of 2022); 1,620,000; 1,297,000 (80.1%)
- Parishes: 76

Information
- Denomination: Catholic
- Sui iuris church: Latin Church
- Rite: Roman Rite
- Established: 18 March 1958 (67 years ago)
- Cathedral: Cathedral of Our Lady of Solitude
- Secular priests: 115 (Diocesan); 20 (Religious Orders); 13 Permanent Deacons

Current leadership
- Pope: Leo XIV
- Archbishop: Leopoldo González González
- Bishops emeritus: Felipe Aguirre Franco

Map

Website
- www.arquiacapulco.org

The Archdiocese of Acapulco (Latin: Archidioecesis Acapulcana) is a Latin rite Metropolitan Archdiocese in Mexico's southwestern Guerrero state.

Its cathedral archiepiscopal see is Catedral Nuestra Señora de la Soledad, dedicated to Our Lady of Solitude, in the touristic port city of Acapulco. It is currently led by Archbishop Leopoldo González González.

== History ==
The Diocese of Acapulco / Acapulcan(us) (Latin) was erected on 18 March 1958, on territory split off from the then Diocese of Chilapa (now its suffragan as Diocese of Chilpancingo–Chilapa.) It lost territory to establish Diocese of Ciudad Altamirano (now its suffragan) on 27 October 1964. It was elevated on 10 February 1983 to the Metropolitan Archdiocese of Acapulco.

== Statistics ==
As of 2014, the archdiocese pastorally served 2,039,000 Catholics (76.9% of 2,650,000 total) on 18,000 km² in 78 parishes and 4 missions with 132 priests (107 diocesan, 25 religious), 19 deacons, 152 lay religious (30 brothers, 122 sisters) and 33 seminarians.

== Bishops ==
(all Roman Rite native Mexicans)

=== Episcopal Ordinaries ===
Suffragan Bishops of Acapulco

- José del Pilar Quezada Valdez (1958.12.18 – retired 1976.06.01), died 1985
- Rafael Bello Ruiz (1976.06.01 – 1983.02.10 see below), succeeding as previous Titular Bishop of Segia (1974.02.12 – 1976.06.01) and Auxiliary Bishop of Acapulco (1974.02.12 – 1976.06.01)

Metropolitan Archbishops of Acapulco

- Rafael Bello Ruiz (see above 1983.02.10 – retired 2001.05.08), died 2008
- Felipe Aguirre Franco (2001.05.08 – retired 2010.06.07), previously Titular Bishop of Otricoli (1974.03.12 – 1988.04.28) as Auxiliary Bishop of Tuxtla Gutiérrez (Mexico) (1974.03.12 – 1988.04.28), succeeding as Bishop of Tuxtla Gutiérrez (1988.04.28 – 2000.06.30), Coadjutor Archbishop of Acapulco (2000.06.30 – succession 2001.05.08)
  - Auxiliary Bishop : Juan Navarro Castellanos (2004.01.31 – 2009.02.12), Titular Bishop of Caput Cilla (2004.01.31 – 2009.02.12); next Bishop of Tuxpan (Mexico) (2009.02.12 – ...)
- Carlos Garfias Merlos (2010.06.07 – retired 2016.11.05), previously Bishop of Ciudad Altamirano (Mexico) (1996.06.24 – 2003.07.08), Bishop of Nezahualcóyotl (Mexico) (2003.07.08 – 2010.06.07); next Metropolitan Archbishop of Morelia (Mexico) (2016.11.05 – ...)
- Leopoldo González González (2017.06.30 – ...), previously Titular Bishop of Voncaria (1999.03.18 – 2005.06.09) as Auxiliary Bishop of Archdiocese of Morelia (Mexico) (1999.03.18 – 2005.06.09), Bishop of Tapachula (Mexico) (2005.06.09 – 2017.06.30).

=== Coadjutor bishop ===
- Felipe Aguirre Franco (2000–2001)

=== Auxiliary bishops ===
- Rafael Bello Ruiz (1974–1976), appointed Bishop here
- Juan Navarro Castellanos (2004–2009), appointed Bishop of Tuxpan, Veracruz

== Ecclesiastical province ==
The Metropolitan's suffragan sees are:

- Roman Catholic Diocese of Chilpancingo-Chilapa, its mother (then as Diocese of Chilapa)
- Diocese of Ciudad Altamirano, its daughter
- Roman Catholic Diocese of Tlapa.

== See also ==
- List of Catholic dioceses in Mexico

== Sources ==
- GCatholic - data for all sections
- Archdiocese of Acapulco page at catholichierarchy.org retrieved July 14, 2006
