= Our Lady of Solitude Cathedral, Acapulco =

Our Lady of Solitude Cathedral
- Catedral de Nuestra Señora de la Soledad de Acapulco
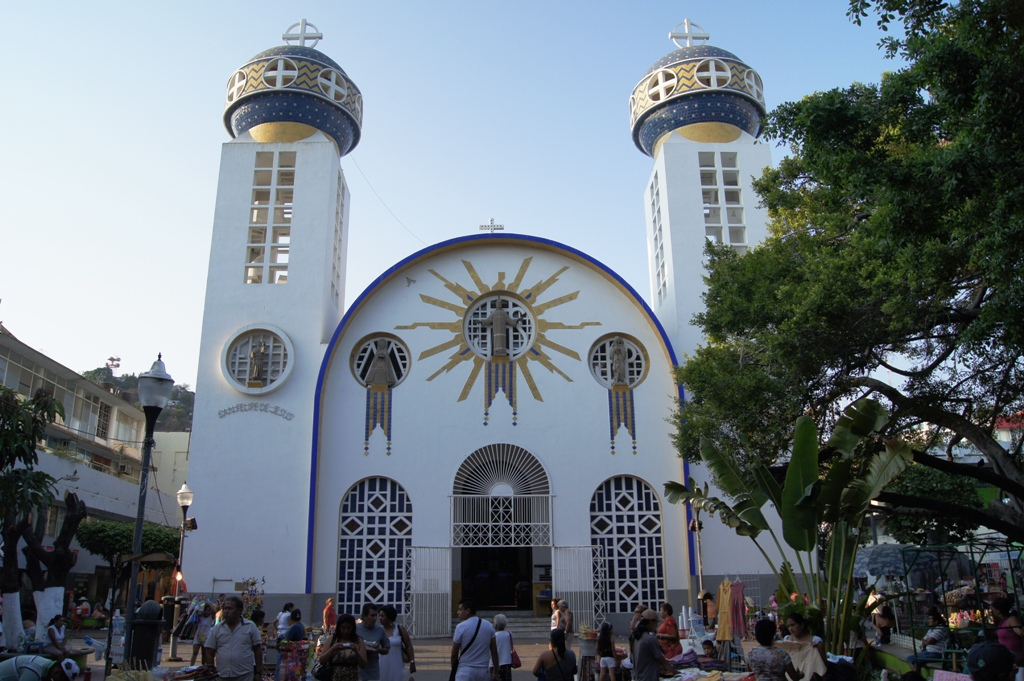
- Our Lady of Solitude Cathedral
- 16°50′56.8″N 99°54′32.2″W
- Location: Acapulco
- Country: Mexico
- Denomination: Roman Catholic Church

The Our Lady of Solitude Cathedral (also Acapulco Cathedral; Spanish: Catedral de Nuestra Señora de la Soledad de Acapulco) is the main Catholic church of the city of Acapulco, Guerrero, Mexico, located in the center of the city in front of the Álvarez Square. It has been the episcopal seat of the Archdiocese of Acapulco since 1958.

It combines architectural styles that were amalgamated during and after construction; details of Neocolonial architecture and Moorish and Byzantine style are present, the latter in the dome and the towers. The interior of the church is decorated with gold tiles and mosaics.

The space occupied by the building has been used for public worship since the founding of the parish in 1555. In 1940, the architect Federico Mariscal was commissioned to design and reconstruct the parish, a process that was completed in the 1950s.

== See also ==
- Roman Catholicism in Mexico
- Our Lady of Solitude

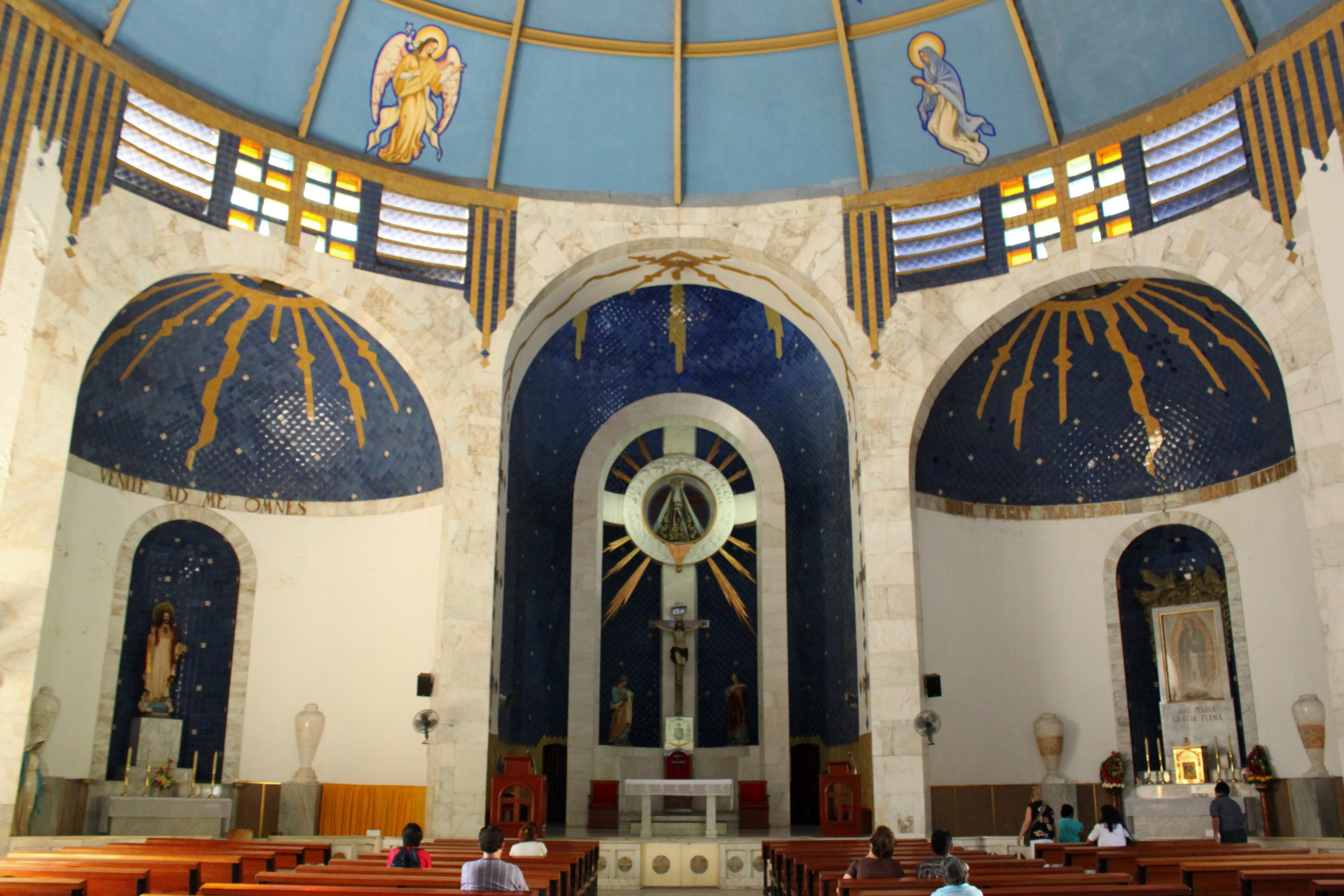
Internal View
