= Diocese of Ciudad Altamirano =

Roman Catholic diocese in Mexico

Coordinates: 18.362599°N 100.666754°W

Diocese of Ciudad Altamirano Dioecesis Civitatis Altamirensis Diócesis de Ciudad Altamirano
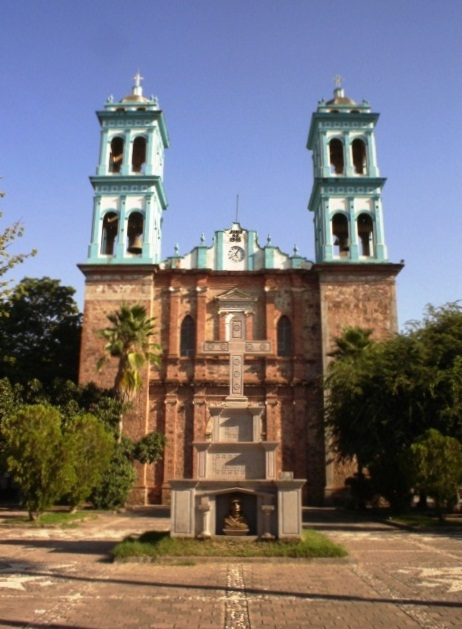
- Catedral de San Juan Bautista

Location
- Country: Mexico
- Ecclesiastical province: Province of Acapulco
- Metropolitan: Ciudad Altamirano, Guerrero

Statistics
- Area: 6,180 sq mi (16,000 km^{2})
- Population: Total; Catholics: (as of 2006); 913,000; 885,000 (96.9%)
- Parishes: 28

Information
- Denomination: Roman Catholic
- Rite: Roman Rite
- Established: 27 October 1964 (61 years ago)
- Cathedral: Cathedral of St. John the Baptist

Current leadership
- Pope: Leo XIV
- Bishop: Sede Vacante
- Metropolitan Archbishop: Leopoldo González González

Map
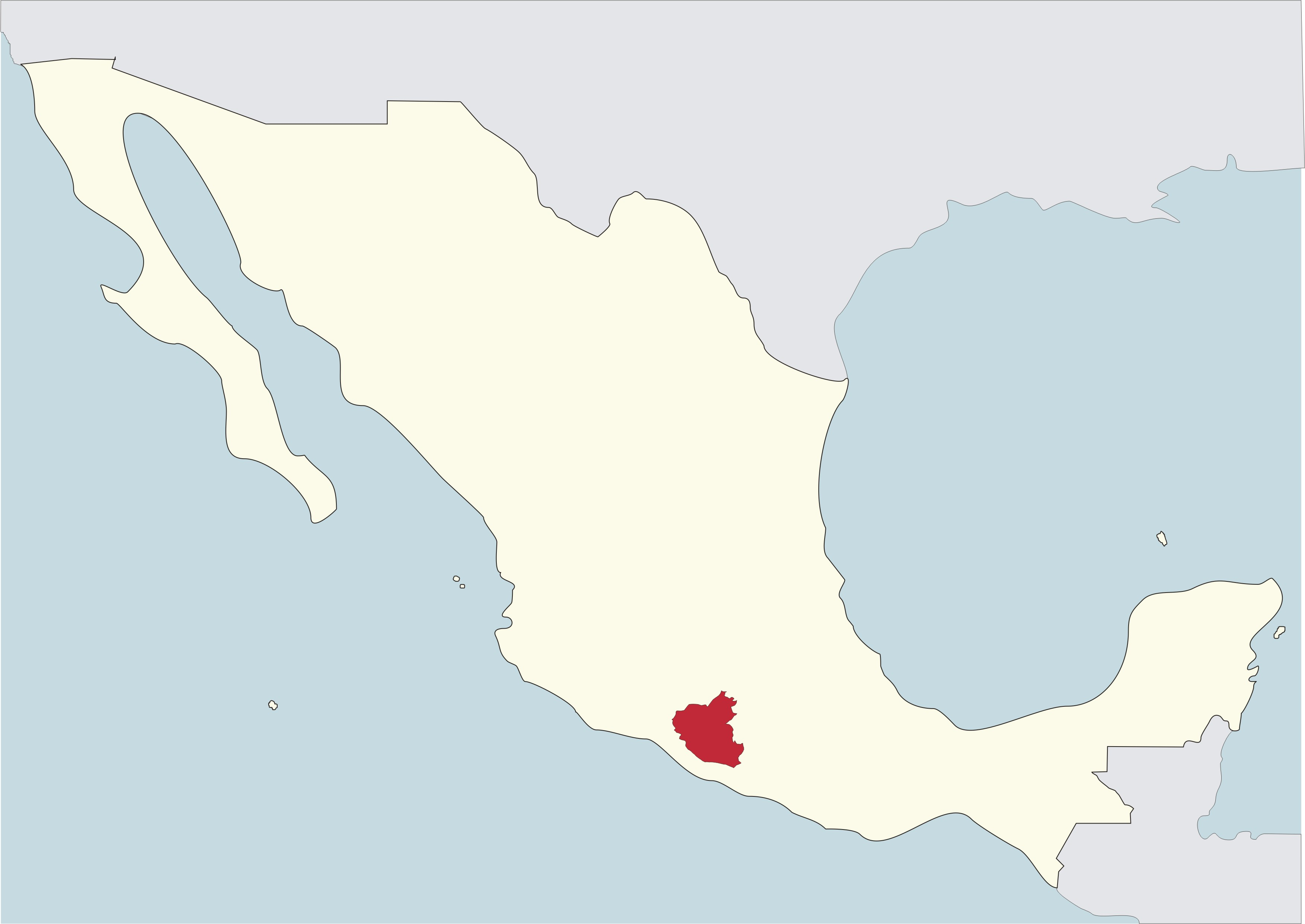

The Roman Catholic Diocese of Ciudad Altamirano (Latin: Dioecesis Civitatis Altamirensis) is a suffragan diocese of the Archdiocese of Acapulco, in Mexico.

== Ordinaries ==
- Juan Navarro Ramirez (1965–1970)
- Manuel Samaniego Barriga (1971–1979), appointed Bishop of Cuautitlán, México
- José Lizares Estrada (1980–1987)
- José Raúl Vera López, O.P. (1987–1995), appointed Coadjutor Bishop of San Cristóbal de Las Casas, Chiapas
- Carlos Garfias Merlos (1996–2003), appointed Bishop of Netzahualcóyotl, México
- José Miguel Ángel Giles Vázquez (2004–2005)
- Maximino Martínez Miranda (2006–2017), appointed Auxiliary Bishop of Toluca, México
  - Salvador Rangel Mendoza, O.F.M (2017–2019), Apostolic Administrator
- Joel Ocampo Gorostieta (2019–2025), appointed Bishop of Zamora, Michoacán

== Episcopal see ==
- Ciudad Altamirano, Guerrero

== External links and references ==
- "Diocese of Ciudad Altamirano". Catholic-Hierarchy.
- "Diocese of Ciudad Altamirano". Catholicer Network.
