= Cathedral of León, Guanajuato =

Cathedral Basilica of Our Lady of the Light
- Catedral Basílica de Nuestra Señora de la Luz
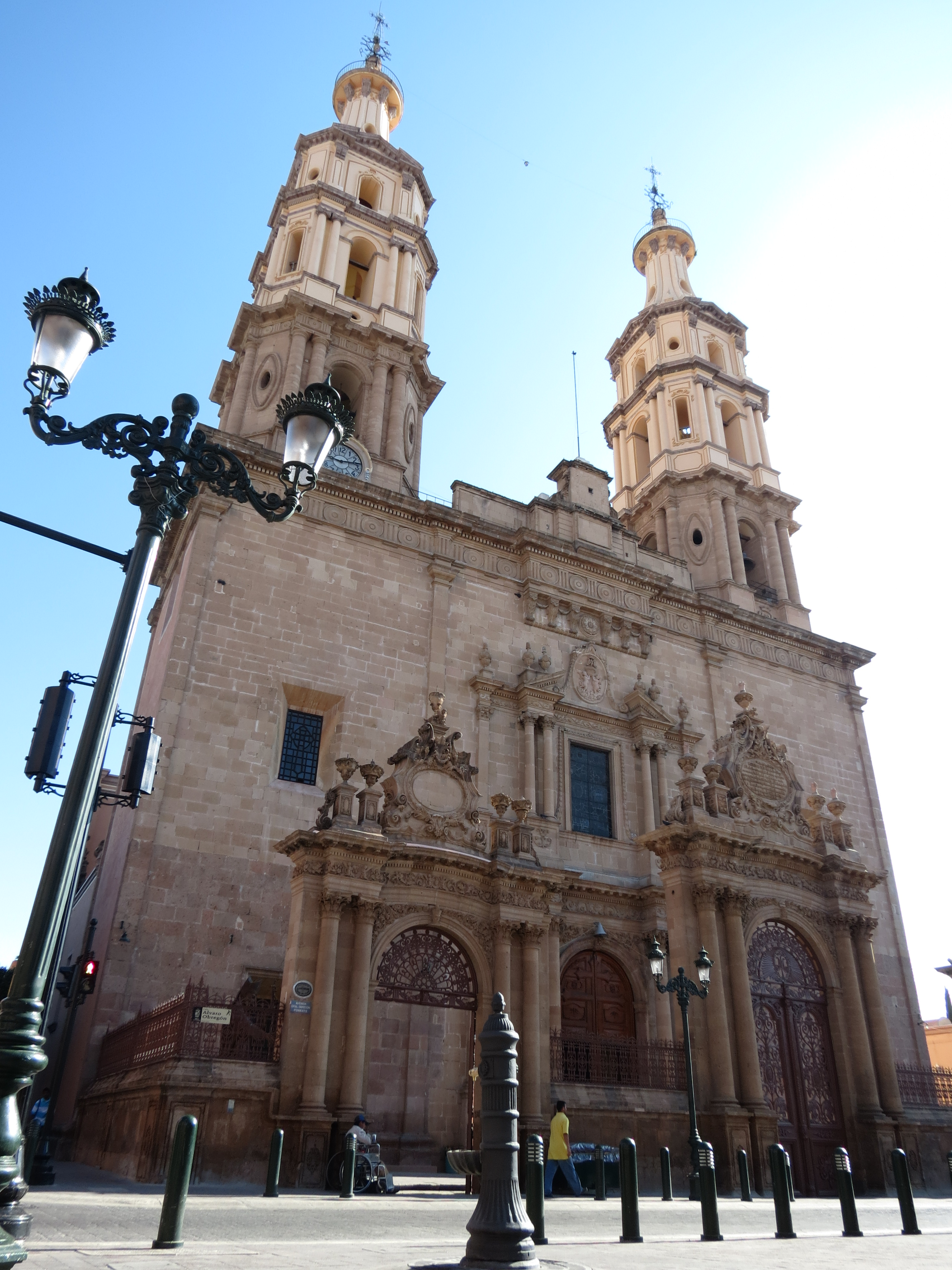
- Cathedral Basilica of Our Lady of the Light
- 21.1242°N 101.6819°W
- Location: León, Guanajuato
- Country: Mexico
- Denomination: Roman Catholic Church

History
- Consecrated: 1866; 160 years ago

The Cathedral Basilica of Our Lady of the Light (Spanish: Catedral Basílica de Nuestra Señora de la Luz) is also called León Cathedral. It is a church of Catholic worship, located in the historic center of the city of León, Mexico. It is the headquarters of the Metropolitan Archdiocese of León. It was consecrated in 1866.

The construction of the Temple of the New Company, future seat of the cathedral began in 1764, the return of the Jesuits to the city, which had left a year earlier because its temple of the Holy School or Companía Vieja, was extremely deteriorated. The new temple would be dedicated to the Virgin of Light, but with the expulsion of the Jesuits in 1767, the works were paralyzed.

The Diocese of León was founded on February 21, 1864. Immediately after entering on duty, the new bishop, Monsignor José María de Jesús Diez de Sollano, worked on the completion of this temple, which is popularly known as New Company and it was established and set out as a cathedral. By then, they had already constructed the vaults (1833-1837). The first body of the eastern tower (1864) was revamped, and the largest bell, weighing 4.5 tons was cast in the months of December 1865 and January 1866.

== See also ==
- Roman Catholicism in Mexico

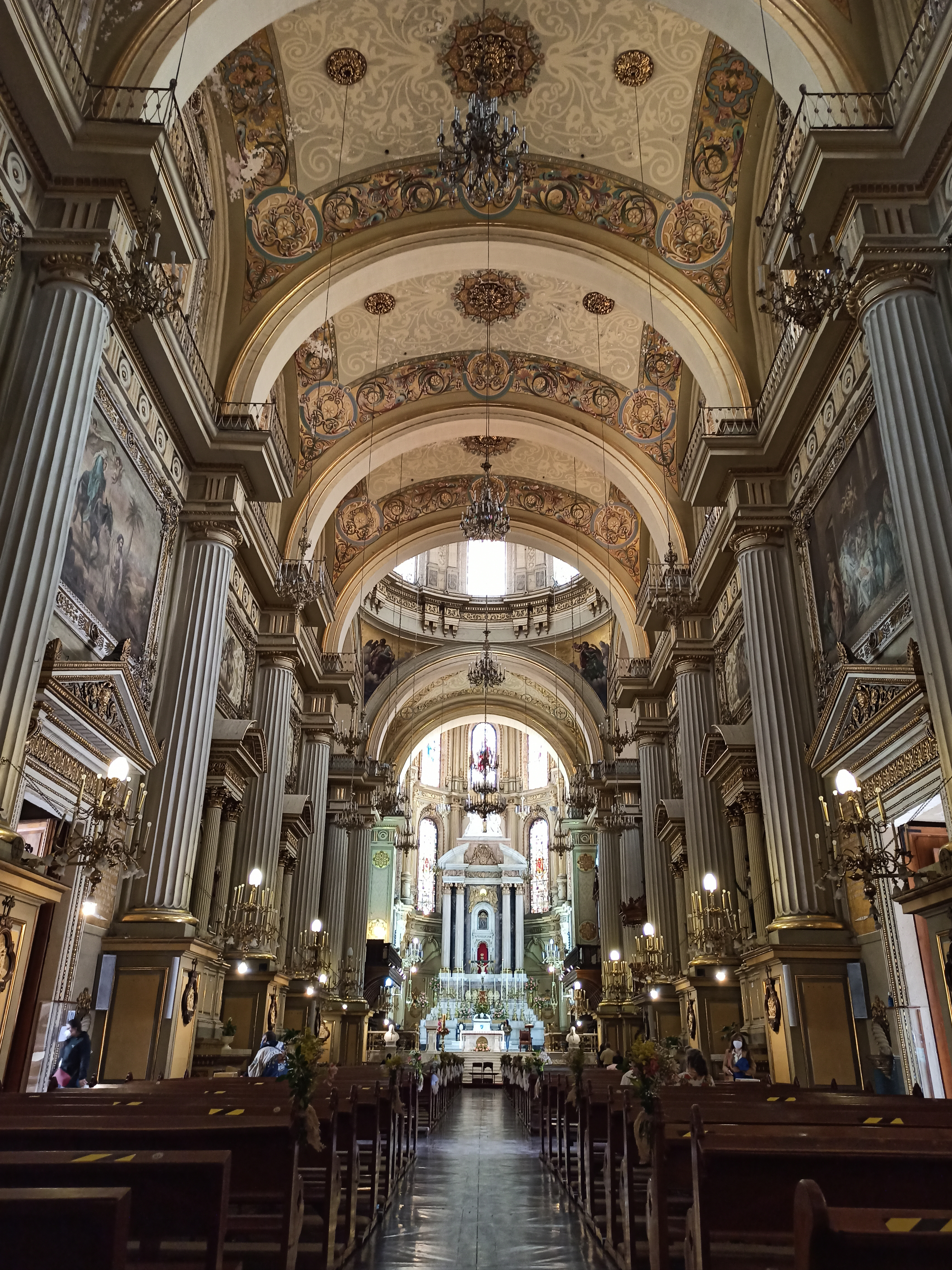
Nave
