= José Luis Castro Medellín =

Catholic Mexican bishop (1938–2020)

José Luis Castro Medellín M.S.F.
- Bishop of Tacámbaro
- Church: Catholic Church
- Diocese: Diocese of Tacámbaro
- In office: 25 October 2002 – 22 August 2014
- Predecessor: Rogelio Cabrera López
- Successor: Gerardo Díaz Vázquez

Orders
- Ordination: 16 June 1963
- Consecration: 3 December 2002 by Giuseppe Bertello

Personal details
- Born: 21 June 1938 Mineral de La Noria, Sombrerete, Zacatecas, Mexico
- Died: 24 January 2020 (aged 81)

José Luis Castro Medellín M.S.F. (21 June 1938 – 24 January 2020) was a Mexican bishop of the Catholic Church who was bishop of Tacámbaro from 2002 to 2014.

== Biography ==
Castro Medellín was born in Mineral de La Noria, Sombrerete, Zacatecas, Mexico, in the Archdiocese of Durango, on 21 June 1938, the third of five children. After studying at the College of St. John Baptist de la Salle, he studied for the priesthood at the seminary of the Missionaries of the Holy Family in Uruapan. In 1971 after two years of study he earned a licentiate in moral theology at the Alphonsian Academy in Rome. He took his final vows as a member of the Missionaries on 10 January 1960 and was ordained a priest as a member of the Missionaries on 16 June 1963 in Uruapan by Bishop José Gabriel Anaya y Diez de Bonilla.

From 1961 to 1963 he was general treasurer of the Missionaries, from 1964 to 1967 he taught its novices, and from 1973 to 1985 he was superior general. From 1985 to 1991 he was vicar and general treasurer; from 1991 to 1997 councilor and general treasurer. From 1992 to 2002 he was vicar for religious and consecrated life in the diocese of Zamora, serving also from 1997 to 2002 as pastor of the Sagrada Familia parish in Uruapan.

On 25 October 2002, Pope John Paul II named him bishop of Tacámbaro. He received his episcopal consecration on 3 December from Archbishop Giuseppe Bertello, Apostolic Nuncio to Mexico.

Pope Francis accepted his resignation on 22 August 2014.

He died on 24 January 2020.
