= Robert-Joseph Coffy =

French Roman Catholic cardinal and archbishop

His Eminence Robert-Joseph Coffy
- Cardinal, Archbishop Emeritus of Marseille
- Church: Roman Catholic Church
- Archdiocese: Marseille
- See: Marseille
- Appointed: 13 April 1985
- Term ended: 22 April 1995
- Predecessor: Roger Etchegaray
- Successor: Bernard Panafieu
- Other post: Cardinal-Priest of San Luigi Maria Grignion de Montfort (1991–95)
- Previous posts: Bishop of Gap (1967–74); Archbishop of Albi (1974–85)

Orders
- Ordination: 28 October 1944
- Consecration: 23 April 1967 by Jean-Baptiste-Étienne Sauvage
- Created cardinal: 28 June 1991 by Pope John Paul II
- Rank: Cardinal-Priest

Personal details
- Born: Robert-Joseph Coffy; 24 October 1920 Le Biot, France
- Died: 15 July 1995 (aged 74) Saint-Zacharie, France
- Buried: Marseille Cathedral
- Motto: Sint unum
- Coat of arms

Styles of Robert Coffy
- Reference style: Son Éminence
- Spoken style: Vôtre Éminence
- Informal style: Cardinal
- See: Marseille

Robert Joseph Coffy (24 October 1920 – 15 July 1995) was a French Roman Catholic cardinal and Archbishop of Marseille.

== Early life and education ==
Coffy was born on 24 October 1920 in Le Biot. His father was a carpenter. He entered the Seminary in Lyon and was ordained to the priesthood 28 October 1944. He carried out pastoral work in Annecy for a year in 1946. He taught as a faculty member where he had been taught in 1948. In the diocese of Annecy he was transferred to be a faculty member of its major seminary from 1949 to 1952, becoming its rector in 1952.

== Episcopate ==
He was appointed as Bishop of Gap by Pope Paul VI in 1967. He was appointed to the metropolitan see of Albi on 15 June 1974. He was transferred to the archdiocese of Marseille by Pope John Paul II on 13 April 1985.

== Cardinalate ==
Archbishop Coffy was created Cardinal-Priest of San Luigi Maria Grignion de Montfort in the consistory of 28 June 1991. He resigned the government of the archdiocese in 1995, dying shortly afterward.

Catholic Church titles
Preceded by Roger Etchegaray	Archbishop of Marseille; 13 April 1985 – 22 April 1995	Succeeded by Bernard Panafieu
