= Felipe Arizmendi Esquivel =

Mexican Roman Catholic prelate

His Eminence Felipe Arizmendi Esquivel
- Cardinal; Bishop Emeritus of San Cristóbal de las Casas
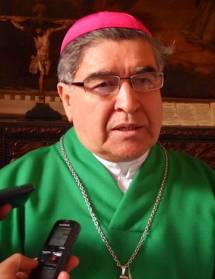
- Arizmendi in 2016
- Church: Roman Catholic Church
- Diocese: San Cristóbal de Las Casas
- See: San Cristóbal de Las Casas
- Appointed: 31 March 2000
- Installed: 1 May 2000
- Term ended: 3 November 2017
- Predecessor: Samuel Ruiz García
- Successor: Rodrigo Aguilar Martínez
- Other post: Cardinal-Priest of San Luigi Maria Grignion de Montfort (2020-)
- Previous posts: Bishop of Tapachula (1991-2000); Secretary General of the Latin American Episcopal Conference (1999-2000)

Orders
- Ordination: 25 August 1963
- Consecration: 7 March 1991 by Girolamo Prigione
- Created cardinal: 28 November 2020 by Francis
- Rank: Cardinal-Priest

Personal details
- Born: Felipe Arizmendi Esquivel; 1 May 1940 (age 86) Chiltepec de Hidalgo, Coatepec Harinas, Estado de México
- Motto: Cristo único camino ("Christ the only way")
- Coat of arms

Felipe Arizmendi Esquivel (born 1 May 1940) is a Mexican prelate of the Catholic Church who served as bishop of Diocese of San Cristóbal de las Casas from 2000 to 2015. From 1991 to 2000 he was Bishop of Tapachula.

Pope Francis raised him to the rank of cardinal on 28 November 2020.

== Biography ==
Felipe Arizmendi Esquivel was born on 1 May 1940 in Coatepec Harinas, Estado de México.

He was ordained a priest on 25 August 1963.

On 7 February 1991, Pope John Paul II appointed him Bishop of Tapachula. He received his episcopal consecration on 7 March 1991 from Archbishop Girolamo Prigione.

On 31 March 2000, Pope John Paul named him Bishop of San Cristobal de las Casas. He succeeded Bishop Samuel Ruiz García, a social progressive who had defended the rights of the indigenous peoples and of the Zapatista rebels. Arizmendi consistently defended Ruiz against his many critics. Arizmendi has a reputation for being theologically conservative but socially progressive.

In 2012, he announced that he would be organizing efforts to translate the Catholic Mass and the Bible into the indigenous language Nahuatl.

On 1 May 2015, Arizmendi submitted his resignation to Pope Francis, but was asked to remain. His resignation was accepted on 3 November 2017.

On 25 October 2020, Pope Francis announced he would raise him to the rank of cardinal at a consistory scheduled for 28 November 2020. At that consistory, Pope France made him Cardinal-Priest of San Luigi Maria Grignion de Montfort. Arizmendi took possession of his titular church the next day.

== See also ==
- Cardinals created by Pope Francis

Catholic Church titles
| Preceded by Luís Miguel Cantón Marín | Bishop of Tapachula; 7 March 1991 – 31 March 2000 | Succeeded by Rogelio Cabrera López |
| Preceded by Samuel Ruiz García | Bishop of San Cristóbal de las Casas; 1 May 2000 – 1 May 2015 | Succeeded by Enrique Díaz Díaz |
| Preceded by Serafim Fernandes de Araújo | Cardinal-Priest of San Luigi Maria Grignion de Montfort; 28 November 2020 – | Incumbent |
