= San Luigi Maria Grignion de Montfort =

St. Louis Grignon de Montfort
- San Luigi Maria Grignion de Montfort (in Italian); S. Ludovici Mariæ Grignion de Montfort (in Latin)
- Click on the map for a fullscreen view
- 41°56′14″N 12°25′26″E
- Location: Viale dei Monfortani 50, Rome
- Country: Italy
- Denomination: Roman Catholic
- Tradition: Roman Rite
- Website: sanluigidimontfort.com, unsafe

History
- Status: Titular church
- Dedication: Louis-Marie Grignion de Montfort
- Consecrated: 1970

Architecture
- Architect: Francesco Romanelli
- Architectural type: Church

The church of San Luigi Maria Grignion de Montfort is a church in Rome, in the Primavalle district, on Avenue of the Montfort, dedicated to Saint Louis-Marie Grignion de Montfort (1673–1716).

== History ==
It was designed by architect Francesco Romanelli, in the late 1960s and consecrated by the Cardinal Vicar Angelo Dell'Acqua on June 30, 1970.

The church is home parish, erected on September 24, 1962, with the decree of the Cardinal Vicar Clemente Micara Cum in suburban, and entrusted to the priests of the Company of Mary (called Montfort). It is home to the cardinal's title of "St. Louis Grignon de Montfort", instituted by Pope John Paul II.

== List of Cardinal Protectors ==
- Robert Coffy (28 June 1991 - 15 July 1995)
- Serafim Fernandes de Araujo (25 February 1998 – 8 October 2019)
- Felipe Arizmendi Esquivel (28 November 2020 – present)
