= José Raúl Vera López =

Mexican bishop

His Excellency, The Most Reverend José Raúl Vera López O.P.
- Bishop Emeritus of Saltillo
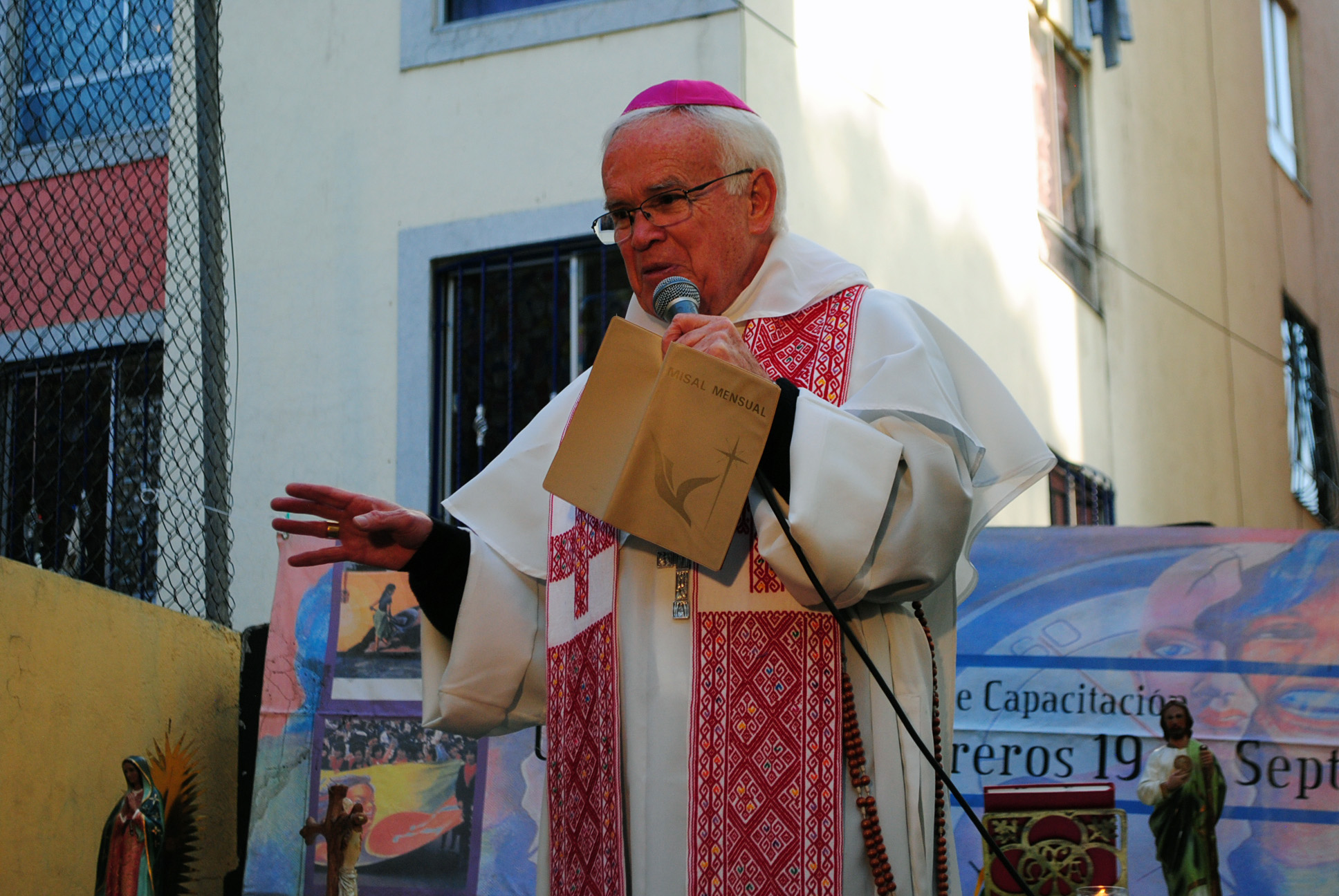
- Church: Roman Catholic Church
- Diocese: Saltillo
- See: Saltillo
- Appointed: 30 December 1999
- Installed: 20 March 2000
- Retired: 21 November 2020
- Predecessor: Francisco Raúl Villalobos Padilla
- Previous posts: Bishop of Ciudad Altamirano (1987-95); Coadjutor Bishop of San Cristóbal de las Casas (1995-99)

Orders
- Ordination: 29 June 1975 by Pope Paul VI
- Consecration: 6 January 1988 by Pope John Paul II

Personal details
- Born: José Raúl Vera López; 21 June 1945 (age 81) Acámbaro, Guanajuato, Mexico
- Education: National Autonomous University of Mexico; Pontifical University of Saint Thomas Aquinas

José Raúl Vera López (born 21 June 1945) is a Mexican friar of the Dominican Order. He was the bishop of the Roman Catholic Diocese of Saltillo from 2000 to 2020. He is known as well for his struggle for human rights and social justice.

== Biography ==
=== Early life and formation ===
Vera López was born on 21 June 1945 in Acámbaro, Guanajuato.

In 1968 he started his religious training in the novitiate of the Order of Preachers, also known as the Dominican Order, in the central Mexican city of León, Guanajuato. Subsequently, he studied philosophy in Mexico City and theology in Bologna, Italy.

Vera López is an alumnus of the Pontifical University of St. Thomas Aquinas (Angelicum) where he obtained a licentiate in Sacred Theology with a grade of summa cum laude. He was ordained a priest by Pope Paul VI on 29 June 1975 and consecrated bishop by Pope John Paul II on 6 January 1988.

=== Episcopal career ===
Vera López held several clerical posts, was appointed bishop of the Diocese of Ciudad Altamirano in 1987, coadjutor bishop of the Diocese of San Cristóbal de Las Casas in 1995, and bishop of the Diocese of Saltillo in 1999.

In addition to his clerical career, Vera López is an avowed advocate for human rights and social justice. With the risk for his own safety he expressed his views against abuse of power, corruption, absence of the rule of law and violations of human rights. Furthermore, he opposes the fact that, although Mexico is not really a poor country, around half of its 110 million people live below the poverty line.

He resigned his bishopric in 2020 upon reaching the age of 75.

In 2025 Vera López concelebrated a mass with a female Anglican minister at the Basilica of Our Lady of Guadalupe in Mexico City, causing outcry among some Catholics.

== Recognition ==
Vera López was nominated for a Nobel Peace Prize in 2012. He received several recognitions, e.g.:

- 2000: Don Sergio Méndez Arceo National Prize for Human Rights
- 2000: Roque Dalton Medal
- 2007: Medal of Merit in Mexico City
- 2009: Samuel Ruiz Award
- 2009: Hijo predilecto de Acámbaro Award
- 2010: Thorolf Rafto Memorial Prize
- 2013: Doctorate honoris causa in humanities from the Dominican Bayamón Central University in Puerto Rico.
