= José Trinidad Sepúlveda Ruiz-Velasco =

Mexican Prelate of the Roman Catholic Church

- Bishop of The Diocese of San Juan de los Lagos
- Church: Roman Catholic Church
- See: The Diocese of San Juan de los Lagos
- In office: 1988 - 1999
- Predecessor: José López Lara
- Successor: Javier Navarro Rodríguez

Orders
- Ordination: March 27, 1948

Personal details
- Born: March 30, 1921; Atotonilco El Alto, Mexico
- Died: September 4, 2017 (aged 96); Ayotlán, Mexico

José Trinidad Sepúlveda Ruiz-Velasco (March 30, 1921 – September 4, 2017) was a Mexican Prelate of the Roman Catholic Church.

Sepúlveda Ruiz-Velasco was born in Atotonilco El Alto, Mexico and was ordained a priest on March 27, 1948. Velasco was appointed archbishop of Archdiocese of Tuxtla Gutiérrez on May 20, 1965, and ordained bishop on July 25, 1965. Velasco was appointed bishop of The Diocese of San Juan de los Lagos on February 12, 1988, where he would remain until his retirement on January 20, 1999. Velasco died on 4 September 2017 due to respiratory complications at the age of 96.
