= Archdiocese of Tuxtla =

Catholic archdiocese in Mexico

Coordinates: 16.7531°N 93.1155°W

Archdiocese of Tuxtla Archidioecesis Tuxtlensis Arquidiócesis de Tuxtla
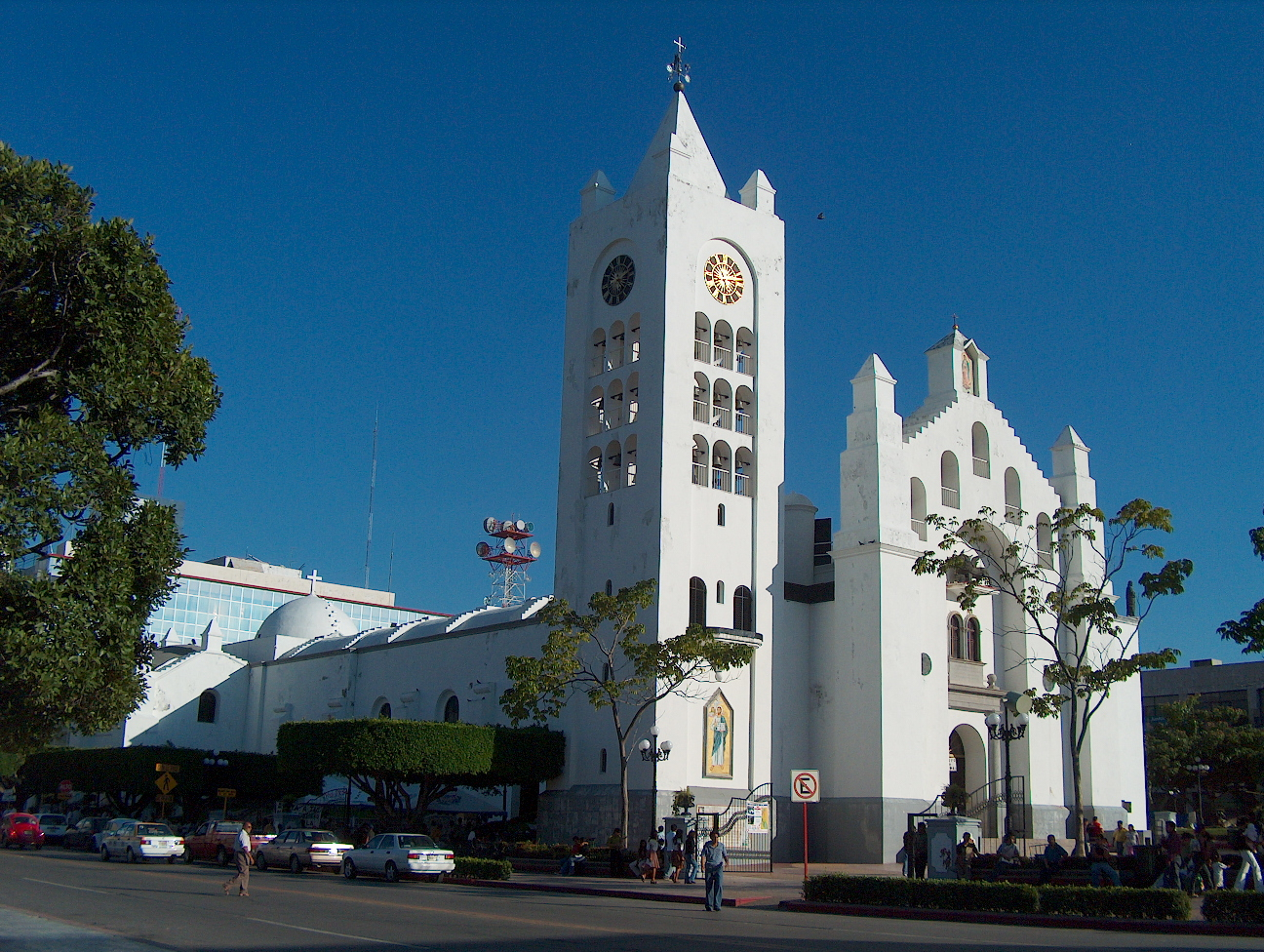
- Saint Mark Cathedral

Location
- Country: Mexico
- Ecclesiastical province: Province of Tuxtla

Statistics
- Area: 22,629 km^{2} (8,737 sq mi)
- Population: Total; Catholics: (as of 2023); 2,026,043; 1,327,825 (65.5%)
- Parishes: 72

Information
- Denomination: Catholic Church
- Sui iuris church: Latin Church
- Rite: Roman Rite
- Established: 27 October 1964; 61 years ago
- Cathedral: Saint Mark's Cathedral
- Secular priests: 172 (151 Diocesan, 21 Religious Orders)

Current leadership
- Pope: Leo XIV
- Metropolitan Archbishop: Jose Francisco Gonzalez Gonzalez
- Auxiliary Bishops: José Mendoza Corzo

Map

The Roman Catholic Archdiocese of Tuxtla (Latin: Archidioecesis Tuxtlensis) is a Metropolitan Archdiocese based in Tuxtla, Chiapas, Mexico. It is responsible for the suffragan dioceses of Tapachula and Las Casas. Pope Benedict XVI elevated it to the level of archdiocese on 25 November 2006.

== Masses in Tzotzil and Tzeltal languages ==
In 2013, Pope Francis approved translations of the prayers for Mass and the celebration of sacraments into Tzotzil and Tzeltal. The translations include "the prayers used for Mass, marriage, baptisms, confirmations, confessions, ordinations and the anointing of the sick Bishop Arizmendi said Oct. 6 that the texts, which took approximately eight years to translate, would be used in his diocese and the neighboring Archdiocese of Tuxtla. Mass has been celebrated in the diocese in recent years with the assistance of translators—except during homilies—Bishop Arizmendi said in an article in the newspaper La Jornada.

== Bishops ==
=== Ordinaries ===
- José Trinidad Sepúlveda Ruiz-Velasco (1965–1988), appointed Bishop of San Juan de los Lagos, Jalisco
- Felipe Aguirre Franco (1988–2000), appointed Coadjutor Archbishop of Acapulco, Guerrero
- José Luis Chávez Botello (2001–2003), appointed Archbishop of Antequera, Oaxaca
- Rogelio Cabrera López (2004–2012), appointed Archbishop of Monterrey, Nuevo León
- Fabio Martínez Castilla (2013–2023); formerly Bishop of Ciudad Lázaro Cárdenas
  - Apostolic Administrator Rodrigo Aguilar Martínez (2023–2025); Bishop of San Cristóbal de Las Casas
- José Francisco González González (2025–Present)

=== Auxiliary bishops ===
- Felipe Aguirre Franco (1974–1988), appointed Bishop here
- José Luis Mendoza Corzo (2007–Present)

=== Other priests of this diocese who became bishops ===
- Óscar Armando Campos Contreras, appointed Auxiliary Bishop of Antequera, Oaxaca in 2006
- José Alberto González Juárez, appointed Bishop of Tuxtepec, Oaxaca in 2015
- Guadalupe Antonio Ruíz Urquín, appointed Prelate of Huautla, Oaxaca in 2020

== See also ==
- List of Roman Catholic archdioceses in México
