= Leopoldo González González =

The Most Reverend Leopoldo González González
- Archbishop of Acapulco
- Church: Roman Catholic Church
- Archdiocese: Acapulco
- See: Acapulco
- Appointed: 30 June 2017
- Installed: 29 August 2017
- Predecessor: Carlos Garfias Merlos
- Previous posts: Titular Bishop of Voncaria (1999–2005); Auxiliary Bishop of Morelia (1999–2005); Bishop of Tapachula (2005–17)

Orders
- Ordination: 23 November 1975 by Estanislao Alcaraz y Figueroa
- Consecration: 19 May 1999 by Alberto Suárez Inda

Personal details
- Born: Leopoldo González González; 31 October 1950 (age 75) Abasolo, Guanajuato, Mexico
- Education: Universidad La Salle
- Motto: Abba Padre

Leopoldo González González (born October 31, 1950) is the current archbishop of Acapulco, Mexico.

González was born on October 31, 1950, in Abasolo, Guanajuato, Mexico. He attended primary school in Abasolo. On January 1, 1964, shortly before turning 14, he entered the Seminary of Morelia where he studied humanities, philosophy, and theology. Studying during three summers, he completed his diploma at the teachers' college, linked to Universidad La Salle.

== Priestly career ==
González was ordained a priest in Morelia Cathedral, on November 23, 1975. His initial ministry was spent as a teacher at the Seminary of Morelia from August 1975 to June 1999. On March 9, 1995, the archbishop Alberto Suárez Inda, Archbishop of Morelia, appointed González as Vicar General of the archdiocese and responsible for the Sacred Heart Pastoral Zone, located in the city of Morelia, its environs, and the community of Tierra Caliente.

González made specialized studies at the Escuela para Formadores in Toluca, an extension of the faculty of psychology of the Pontifical Gregorian University of Rome. On March 18, 1999, Pope John Paul II appointed him titular bishop of Voncaria and auxiliary of Morelia.

== Episcopal career ==
González received episcopal ordination on May 19, 1999. As Auxiliary Bishop he was in charge of the permanent formation of the Morelia clergy and member of the Episcopal Commission of Indigenous Pastoral for the triennium 2004-2006. In anticipation of the Great Jubilee of the Year 2000, which John Paul II designated as the Year of the Father, the new bishop assumed as his episcopal motto: "Abbá, Padre".

On June 9, 2006, Benedict XVI appointed him as Bishop of Tapachula, which he held until 2017, when Pope Francis named him Archbishop of Acapulco.
