= Roman Catholic Diocese of Querétaro =

Catholic diocese in Mexico

Diocese of Querétaro Dioecesis Queretarensis Diócesis de Querétaro
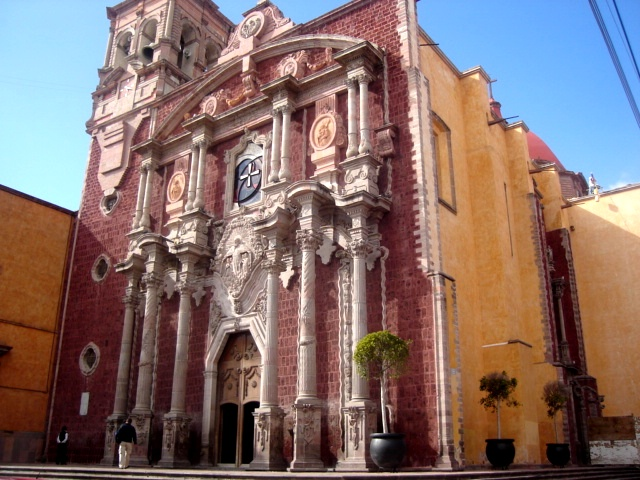
- Catedral de San Felipe Neri

Location
- Country: Mexico
- Ecclesiastical province: Province of León

Statistics
- Area: 5,919 sq mi (15,330 km^{2})
- Population: Total; Catholics: (as of 2004); 1,730,034; 1,643,532 (95%)
- Parishes: 94

Information
- Denomination: Catholic
- Sui iuris church: Latin Church
- Rite: Roman Rite
- Established: 26 January 1863 (163 years ago)
- Cathedral: Cathedral of St. Philip Neri

Current leadership
- Pope: Leo XIV
- Bishop: Víctor Alejandro Aguilar Ledesma
- Metropolitan Archbishop: Alfonso Cortés Contreras
- Bishops emeritus: Mario de Gasperín Gasperín Fidencio López Plaza

Map
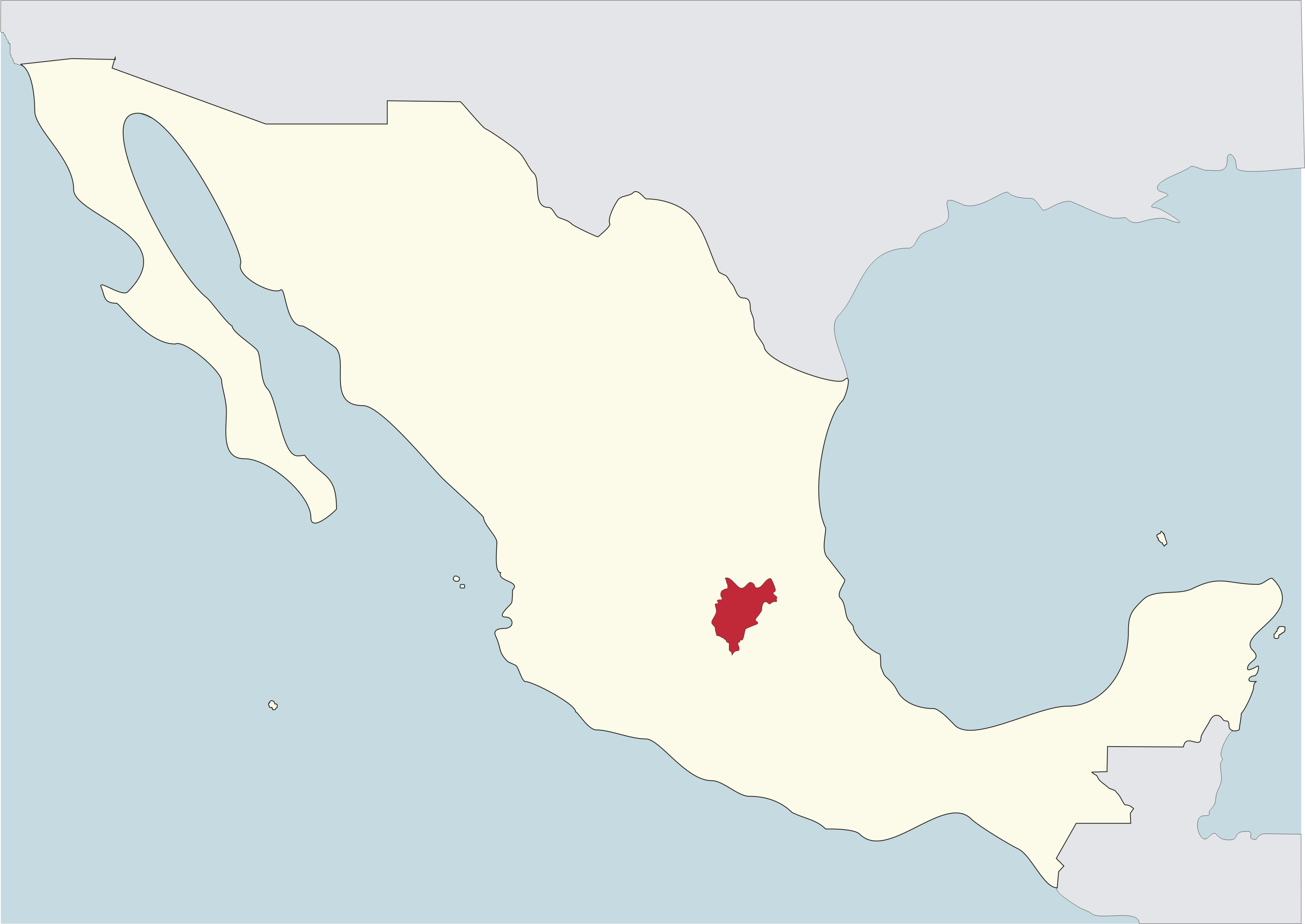

Website
- diocesisqro.org

The Diocese of Querétaro (Latin: Dioecesis Queretarensis) is the Catholic Church's diocese of the Mexican state of Querétaro. Erected on January 26, 1863, it covers an area of 15,326 km². (5,919 square miles), and contains a population of 1,730,034—95% of which are Catholic. It belongs to the Province of León.

== History ==
Querétaro has been a site for the Catholic Church's activity since 1601, when the Carmelites established themselves there. Dominicans, Augustinians and other houses soon followed. One of the most notable institutions of Querétaro was the college of Apostolic missionaries, which Innocent XI called the greatest influence for the propagation of the faith in the Indies. From here missionaries went forth to evangelize Sonora, California, Texas, and Tamaulipas. Adjoining the residence of the bishop in the capital near the church of La Cruz, is the Convent of La Cruz, occupied as headquarters by Maximilian during the siege of the city by General Escobedo in May, 1867. The Capuchin Convent was used as a prison for the Emperor Maximilian and his two generals, Miguel Miramón and Tomás Mejía. It was on the hill of Las Campanas on the outskirts of the town that these generals were shot, June 19, 1867. An elaborate mortuary chapel has replaced the former modest monument erected on the site. At Querétaro was ratified in 1848 the treaty by which Mexico ceded to the United States, at the close of the war, the territory covered by Texas, New Mexico, Arizona, and Upper California.

== List of bishops ==
- Bernardo Gárate y López de Arizmendi (March 19, 1863 - 31 July 1866)
- Ramón Camacho y García (June 22, 1868 - July 30, 1884)
- Rafael Sabás Camacho y García (March 27, 1885 - May 11, 1908)
- Manuel Rivera y Muñoz (May 11, 1908 - May 2, 1914)
- Francisco Banegas y Galván (February 28, 1919 - November 14, 1932)
- Marciano Tinajero y Estrada (July 2, 1933 - October 27, 1957)
- Alfonso Tóriz Cobián (March 20, 1958 - October 25, 1988)
- Mario de Gasperín Gasperín (April 4, 1989 - April 20, 2011)
- Faustino Armendáriz Jiménez (April 20, 2011 – September 21, 2019), appointed Archbishop of Durango
- Fidencio López Plaza (September 12, 2020 – September 21, 2026)
- Víctor Alejandro Aguilar Ledesma (since September 21, 2026)
