= Diocese of San Cristóbal de Las Casas =

Roman Catholic diocese in Mexico

Diocese of San Cristóbal de Las Casas Dioecesis Sancti Christophori de las Casas Diócesis de San Cristóbal de Las Casas
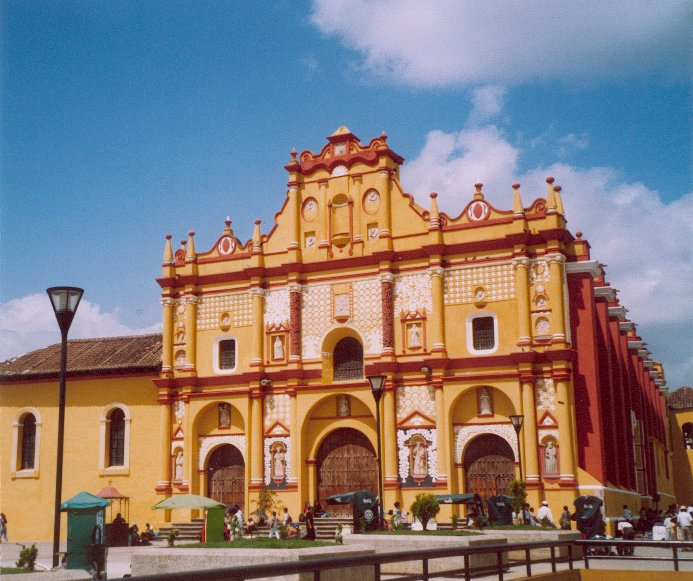
- Catedral de San Cristóbal

Location
- Country: Mexico
- Ecclesiastical province: Province of Tuxtla
- Metropolitan: San Cristóbal de Las Casas

Statistics
- Area: 8,740 sq mi (22,600 km^{2})
- Population: Total; Catholics: (as of 2010); 1,691,000; 1,346,000 (79.6%)
- Parishes: 52

Information
- Denomination: Roman Catholic
- Rite: Roman Rite
- Established: 19 March 1539 (487 years ago)
- Cathedral: Saint Mark's Cathedral

Current leadership
- Pope: Leo XIV
- Bishop: Rodrigo Aguilar Martínez
- Metropolitan Archbishop: Domingo Díaz Martínez
- Auxiliary Bishops: Luis Manuel López Alfaro
- Bishops emeritus: Felipe Arizmendi Esquivel

Map

Website
- ualcor.wix.com/dscl

The Roman Catholic Diocese of San Cristóbal de Las Casas (Latin: Dioecesis Sancti Christophori de las Casas) (erected 19 March 1539 as the Diocese of Chiapas, renamed 27 October 1964) is a suffragan diocese of the Archdiocese of Tuxtla. Its see is in San Cristóbal de las Casas in Chiapas. In November 2017 Rodrigo Aguilar Martínez was appointed new bishop on the resignation of Bishop Felipe Arizmendi Esquivel.

== Bishops ==
=== Ordinaries ===
Diocese of Chiapas

Erected: 19 March 1539

- Juan de Urteaga, O.S.H. (1539–1540 died)
- Juan de Arteaga y Avendaño (1540–1540, died)
- Bartolomé de las Casas, O.P. (1543–1550, resigned)
- Tomás Casillas, O.P. (1551–1567, died)
- Pedro Martín Fernández, O.P. (1574–1588, died)
- Andrés de Ubilla, O.P. (1592–1603, appointed Bishop of Michoacán)
- Lucas Duran, O.S. (1605–1607, resigned)
- Juan Pedro González de Mendoza, O.S.A. (1607–1608, appointed Bishop of Popayán)
- Juan Tomás de Blanes, O.P. (1609–1612, died)
- Juan de Zapata y Sandoval, O.S.A. (1613–1621, appointed Bishop of Santiago de Guatemala)
- Bernardino de Salazar y Frías (1621–1626, died)
- Agustín de Ugarte y Sarabia (1629–1630, appointed Bishop of Santiago de Guatemala)
- Marcos Ramírez de Prado y Ovando, O.F.M. (1633–1639, appointed Bishop of Michoacán)
- Cristóbal Pérez Lazarraga y Maneli Viana, O. Cist. (1639–1640, appointed Bishop of Cartagena)
- Domingo Ramírez de Arellano, O.S.H. (1640–1652, appointed Bishop of Yucatán)
- Mauro Diego de Tovar y Valle Maldonado, O.S.B. (1652–1666, died)
- Bernardo Cristóbal de Quirós (1670–1672, appointed Bishop of Popayán)
- Marcos Bravo de la Serna Manrique (1674–1680, died)
- Francisco Núñez de la Vega, O.P. (1682–1706, died)
- Juan Bautista Alvarez de Toledo, O.F.M. (1708–1714, appointed Bishop of Santiago de Guatemala)
- Jacinto Olivera y Pardo (1714–1733, died)
- José Cubero Ramírez de Arellano, O. de M. (1734–1752, died)
- José Vidal de Moctezuma y Tobar, O. de M. (1753–1766, died)
- Miguel Cilieza y Velasco (1767–1768, died)
- Lucas Ramírez Galán, O.F.M.Obs. (1769–1769, confirmed Archbishop of Santafé en Nueva Granada)
- Juan Manuel Garcia de Vargas y Ribera, O. de M. (1769–1774, died)
- Antonio Caballero y Góngora (1775–1775, confirmed Bishop of Yucatán)
- Francisco Polanco (1775–1784, died)
- Jose Martinez Palomino y Lopez de Lorena (1785–1788, resigned)
- Francisco Gabriel de Olivares y Benito (1788–1795, appointed Bishop of Durango)
- Fermín José Fuero y Gómez Martinez Arañon (1795–1800, died)
- Andrés Ambrosio de Llanos y Valdés, O.F.M. (1801–1815, died)
- Salvador de Sanmartin y Cuevas (1816–1821, died)
- Luis García Guillén, O. de M. (1831–1834, died)
- José María Luciano Becerra y Jiménez (1839–1852, appointed Bishop of Tlaxcala)
- Carlos María Colina y Rubio (1854–1863, appointed Bishop of Tlaxcala)
- Carlos Manuel Ladrón de Guevara (1863–1869, died)
- Germán de Ascensión Villalvazo y Rodríguez (1869–1879, died)
- Ramón María de San José Moreno y Castañeda, O. Carm. (1879–1882, resigned)
- Miguel Mariano Luque y Ayerdi (1884–1901, died)
- Francisco Orozco y Jiménez (1902–1912, appointed Archbishop of Guadalajara)
- Maximino Ruiz y Flores (1913–1920, resigned)
- Gerardo Anaya y Diez de Bonilla (1920–1941, appointed Bishop of San Luis Potosí)
- Lucio Torreblanca y Tapia (1944–1959, appointed Bishop of Durango)
- Samuel Ruiz García (1959–1964)

Diocese of San Cristóbal de Las Casas

Name Changes: 27 October 1964

- Samuel Ruiz García (27 Oct 1964 - 13 Mar 2000, retired)
- Felipe Arizmendi Esquivel (31 Mar 2000 - 3 November 2017, resigned)
- Rodrigo Aguilar Martínez (3 November 2017 – present)

=== Coadjutor bishop ===
- José Raúl Vera López, O.P. (1995-1999); did not succeed to see; appointed Bishop of Saltillo, Coahuila
- Enrique Díaz Díaz (2014-2017); did not succeed the see; appointed Bishop of Irapuato

=== Auxiliary bishop ===
- Enrique Díaz Díaz (2003-2014), appointed Coadjutor here
- Luis Manuel López Alfaro (2020-)
