= San Policarpo all'Acquedotto Claudio =

- Church of Saint Polycarp at the Aqua Claudia
- Chiesa di San Policarpo all'Acquedotto Claudio
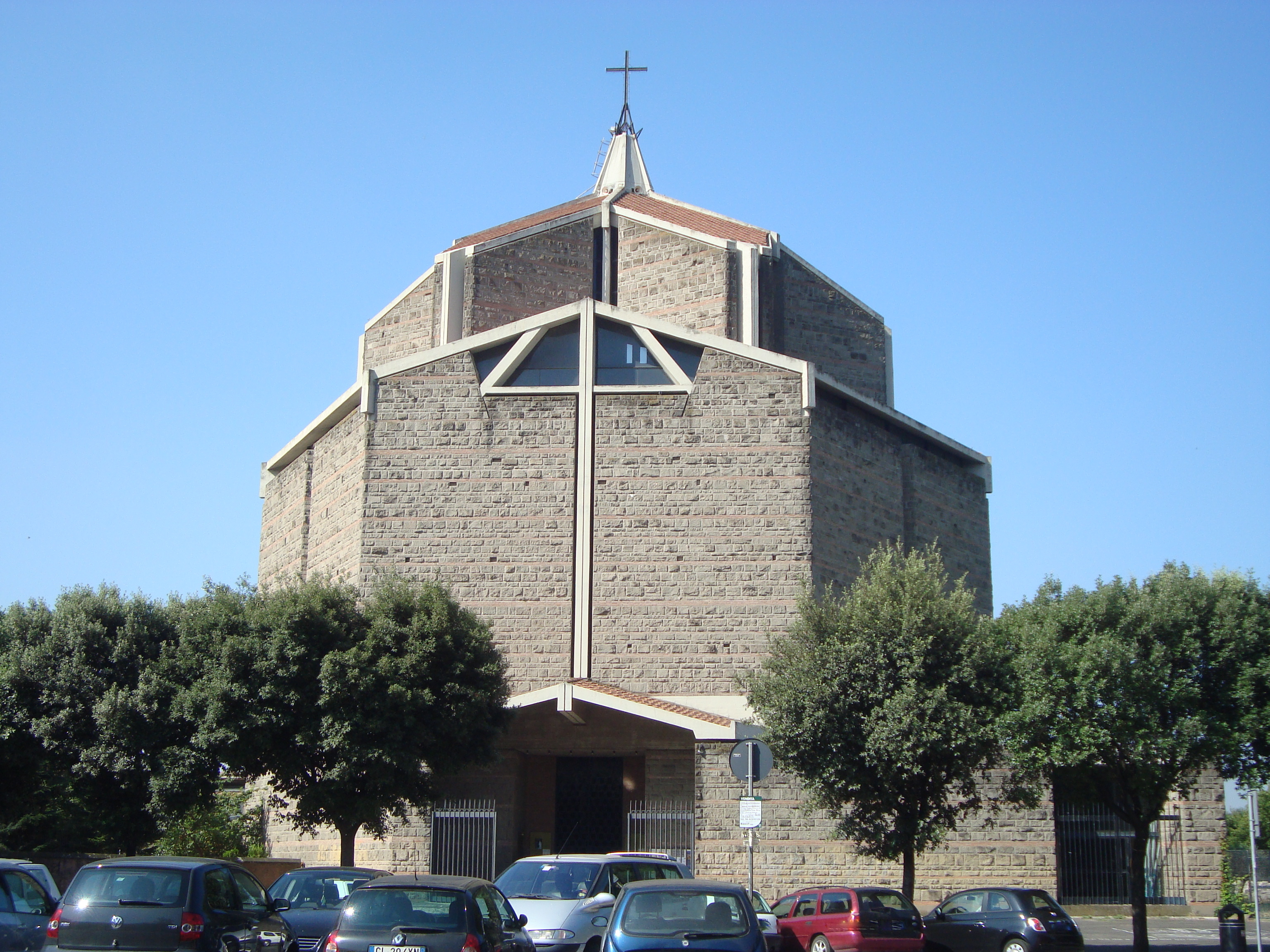
- Click on the map for a fullscreen view
- 41°51′09″N 12°33′29″E
- Location: Piazza Aruleno Celio Sabino 50, Rome
- Country: Italy
- Language: Italian
- Denomination: Catholic
- Tradition: Roman Rite
- Website: sanpolicarpo.it

History
- Status: titular church
- Founded: 1964
- Dedication: Polycarp
- Consecrated: 15 July 1967

Architecture
- Architect: Giuseppe Nicolosi
- Architectural type: Modernist
- Completed: 1967

Administration
- Diocese: Rome

San Policarpo all'Acquedotto Claudio is a parochial church in Rome and titular church for a Cardinal-Priest.

It is named for the Aqua Claudia aqueduct nearby, and for Polycarp, a 2nd-century AD saint and writer.

== Parish church ==
The church was built in 1967 for a parish which was created in 1960, in East Rome's XXth prefecture. It is located on Piazza Aruleno Celio Sabino 50, Roma, Roma, Lazio 00174 at the Via Lemonia.

Pope John Paul II visited the church twice, on 2 May 1982 and 11 March 1990.

On 14 February 2015, it was made a titular church to be held by a Cardinal-Priest.

List

- Alberto Suárez Inda (2015.02.14 – present)

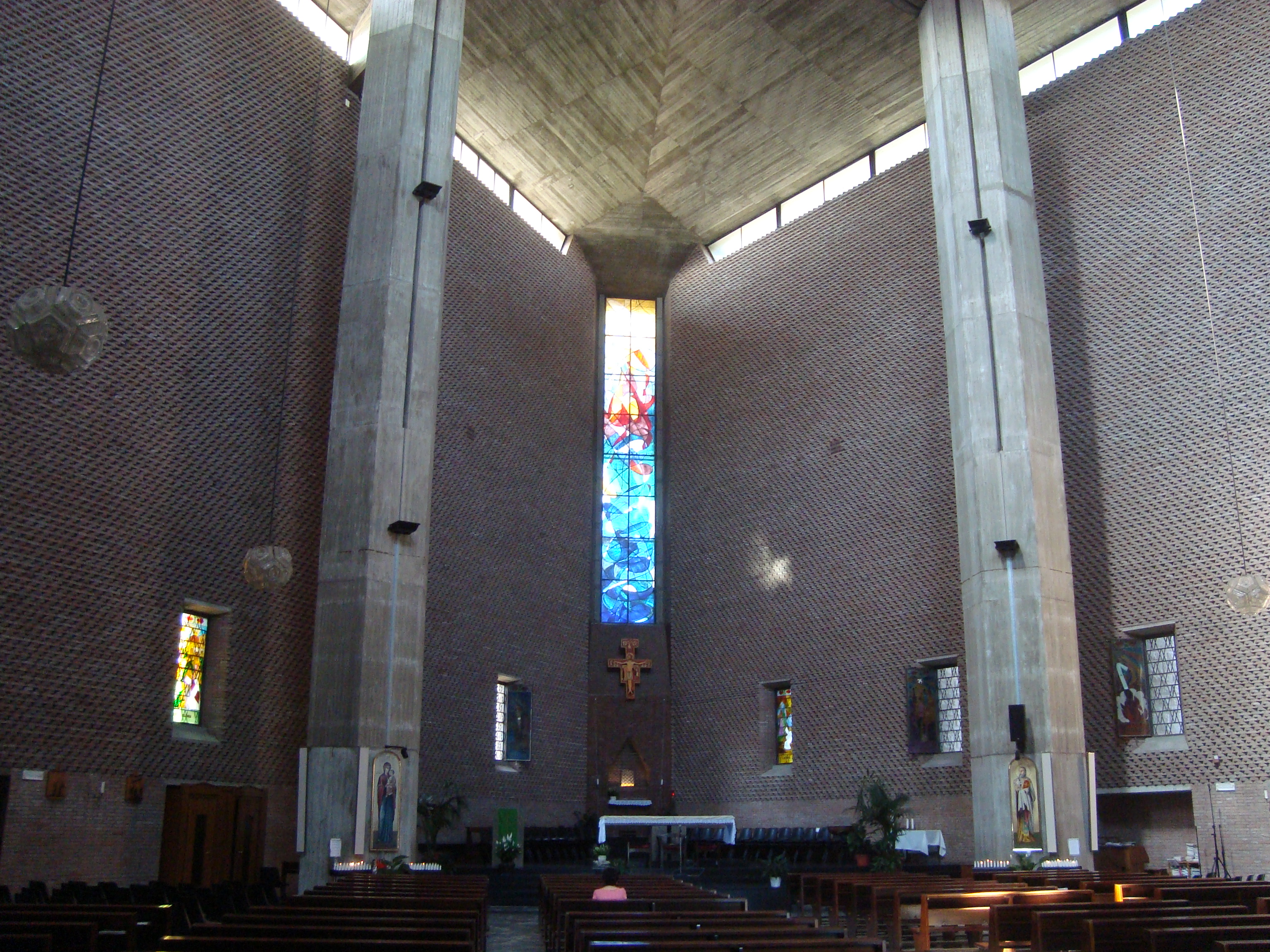
Interior
