= Archdiocese of León =

Roman Catholic archdiocese in Mexico

Coordinates: 21.1243°N 101.6820°W

Archdiocese of León Archidioecesis Leonensis Arquidiócesis de León
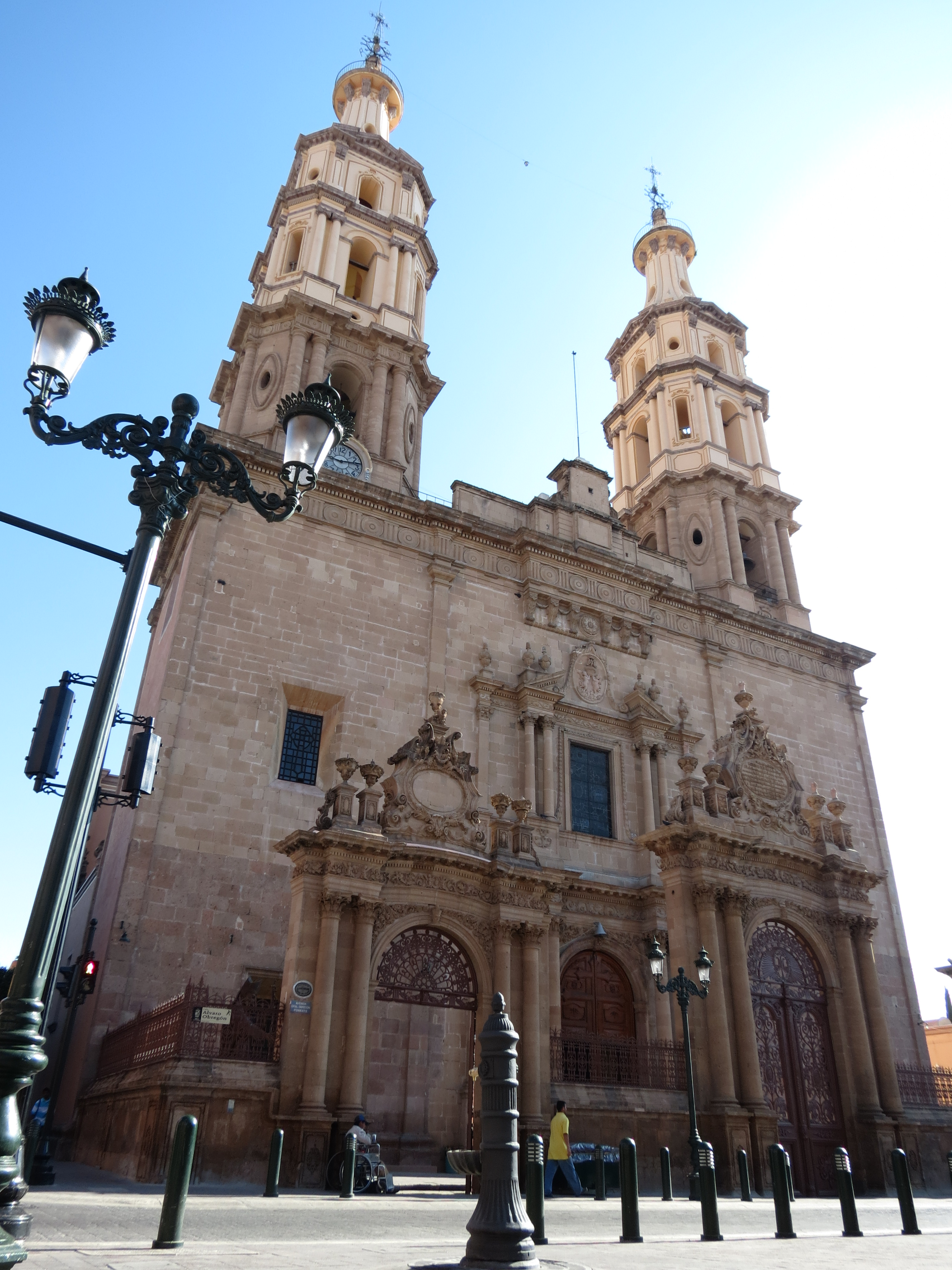
- Catedral Basílica de Nuestra Señora de la Luz

Location
- Country: Mexico
- Ecclesiastical province: Province of León
- Metropolitan: León, Guanajuato

Statistics
- Area: 3,395 sq mi (8,790 km^{2})
- Population: Total; Catholics: (as of 2004); 3,795,967; 3,416,000 (90%)
- Parishes: 98

Information
- Denomination: Roman Catholic
- Rite: Roman Rite
- Established: 26 January 1863 (163 years ago)
- Cathedral: Cathedral Basilica of Our Lady of the Light

Current leadership
- Pope: Leo XIV
- Archbishop: Jaime Calderón Calderón
- Bishops emeritus: José Martín Rábago; Alfonso Cortés Contreras

Map

Website
- arquileon.org

The Roman Catholic Archdiocese of León (Latin: Archidioecesis Leonensis) is an ecclesiastical territory or Metropolitan diocese of the Roman Catholic Church based in the Mexican city of León, Guanajuato. It currently covers an area of 41,940 km^{2}, and has a population of 6,500,000, including the states of Guanajuato and Querétaro. It was created as the Diocese of León on January 26, 1863, by Pope Pius IX, and elevated to the rank of a metropolitan archdiocese by Pope Benedict XVI on November 25, 2006, with the suffragan sees of Celaya, Irapuato, and Querétaro.

The archdiocese's motherchurch and thus seat of its archbishop is the Catedral Basílica de Nuestra Señora de la Luz.

== Boundaries ==
The Archdiocese of León is the metropolitan see of the suffragan dioceses of Irapuato, Celaya, Querétaro.

The Archdiocese of León covers the municipalities of León de los Aldama, Guanajuato, San Felipe, Ocampo, San Francisco del Rincón, Purísima del Rincón, Romita, Silao and Cd. Manuel Doblado.

The Diocese of Irapuato includes the municipalities of Abasolo, Cuerámaro, Huanímaro, Irapuato, Jaral del Progreso, Pénjamo, Pueblo Nuevo, Salamanca, and Valle de Santiago.

The Diocese of Celaya covers 11 municipalities: San Diego de la Unión, Dolores Hidalgo, San Luis de la Paz, San Miguel de Allende, Santa Cruz de Juventino Rosas, Comonfort, Villagrán, Celaya, Apaseo el Grande, Cortazar, and Apaseo el Alto.

The Diocese of Querétaro covers 18 municipalities of the State of Querétaro and 7 municipalities of Guanajuato: Atarjea, Docto Mora, San José Iturbide, Santa Catarina, Tierra Blanca, Victoria, and Xichú.

== Bishops ==
=== List of Ordinaries of León ===
- José de Sollano y Dávaols (1863–1881)
- Tomás Barón y Morales (1882–1898)
- Santiago Garza Zambrano (1898–1900), appointed Archbishop of Linares o Nueva León, Nuevo León
- Leopoldo Ruiz y Flóres (1900–1907), appointed Archbishop of Linares o Nueva León, Nuevo León
- José Mora y del Rio (1907–1908), appointed Archbishop of México, Federal District
- Emeterio Valverde y Télles (1909–1948)
- Manuel Martín del Campo Padilla (1948–1965), appointed Coadjutor Archbishop of Morelia, Michoacán
- Anselmo Zarza Bernal (1966–1992)
- Rafael Garcia González (1992–1994)
- José Martín Rábago (1995–2012)
- Alfonso Cortés Contreras (2012–2024)
- Jaime Calderón Calderón (2024–present)

=== Coadjutor bishop ===
- Manuel Martín del Campo Padilla (1946–1948)

=== Auxiliary bishop ===
- Juan Frausto Pallares (2005–2016)

=== Other priests of this diocese who became bishops ===
- Andrés Segura y Domínguez, appointed Bishop of Tepic, Nayarit in 1906
- Miguel Darío Miranda y Gómez, appointed Bishop of Tulancingo, Hidalgo in 1937; future Cardinal
- José Ulises Macías Salcedo, appointed Bishop of Mexicali, Baja California Norte in 1984
- Gonzalo Galván Castillo, appointed Bishop of Autlán, Jalisco in 2004
- José Guadalupe Torres Campos (priest here, 1984–2004), appointed auxiliary bishop of Ciudad Juárez, Chihuahua in 2005
- Armando António Ortíz Aguirre, appointed Bishop of Ciudad Lázaro Cárdenas, Michoacán in 2013
- Francisco González Ramos (priest here, 1982–2004), appointed Bishop of Izcalli, México in 2014

== See also ==
- List of Roman Catholic archdioceses in México
