= Episcopal Conference of Mexico =

Mexican assembly of Catholic bishops

Mexican Episcopal Conference
- Conferencia del Episcopado Mexicano
- Abbreviation: CEM
- Headquarters: Calz. de los Misterios 26, Tepeyac Insurgentes, 07020 Ciudad de México, México
- President: Rogelio Cabrera López
- Vice President: Gustavo Rodríguez Vega
- Website: www.cem.org.mx

The Mexican Episcopal Conference (Spanish: Conferencia del Episcopado Mexicano, CEM) is an organization of Catholic bishops, known as an episcopal conference. It is the official leadership body of the Catholic Church in Mexico.

== Organization ==
The organization is governed by the Presidency Council, consisting of:

- Card. Francisco Robles Ortega, Archbishop of Guadalajara, Jalisco
- Vice President: Mons. Javier Navarro Rodríguez, Bishop of Zamora
- Secretary General: Bishop Alfonso Gerardo Miranda Guardiola, Auxiliary Bishop of Monterrey
- General Treasurer: Mons. Ramon Castro Castro, Bishop of Cuernavaca
- Members: Mons. Oscar Roberto Dominguez Couttolenc, Mgr. Sigifredo Noriega Barceló, Mons. Carlos Garfias Merlos

== Members ==
The members of the CEM are all Diocesan Archbishops and Bishops, Eastern Rite Bishops, Diocesan Administrators and all those entitled to Diocesan Bishops, Coadjutors and Auxiliary Bishops and titular Bishops who carry out their functions within the Mexican territory, including the Apostolic Nuncio.

Currently, the bishops belonging to the CEM are classified as follows:

- 6 Cardinals (4 archbishops and 2 emeriti)
- 16 residential archbishops
- 66 bishops (residential and prelates)
- 31 auxiliary bishops
- 39 bishops emeriti (8 archbishops and 31 bishops)
- 1 bishop of the Maronite eparchy
- 1 Administrator of the Greek Melkite eparchy
- 1 Apostolic Nuncio
