= List of Catholic dioceses in Mexico =

The Catholic Church in Mexico comprises eighteen ecclesiastical provinces each headed by an archbishop. The provinces in turn comprise 18 archdioceses, 69 dioceses, and 5 territorial prelatures and each headed by a bishop (of some kind).

== List of Dioceses ==
=== Ecclesiastical province of Acapulco ===
- Archdiocese of Acapulco
  - Diocese of Chilpancingo-Chilapa
  - Diocese of Ciudad Altamirano
  - Diocese of Tlapa

=== Ecclesiastical province of Antequera, Oaxaca ===
- Archdiocese of Antequera, Oaxaca
  - Diocese of Puerto Escondido
  - Diocese of Tehuantepec
  - Diocese of Tuxtepec
  - Prelature of Huautla
  - Prelature of Mixes

=== Ecclesiastical province of Chihuahua ===
- Archdiocese of Chihuahua
  - Diocese of Ciudad Juárez
  - Diocese of Cuauhtémoc-Madera
  - Diocese of Nuevo Casas Grandes
  - Diocese of Parral
  - Diocese of Tarahumara

=== Ecclesiastical province of Durango ===
- Archdiocese of Durango
  - Diocese of Mazatlán
  - Diocese of Torreón
  - Diocese of Gómez Palacio
  - Prelature of El Salto

=== Ecclesiastical province of Guadalajara ===
- Archdiocese of Guadalajara
  - Diocese of Aguascalientes
  - Diocese of Autlán
  - Diocese of Ciudad Guzmán
  - Diocese of Colima
  - Diocese of San Juan de los Lagos
  - Diocese of Tepic
  - Prelature of Jesús María del Nayar

=== Ecclesiastical province of Hermosillo ===
- Archdiocese of Hermosillo
  - Diocese of Ciudad Obregón
  - Diocese of Culiacán
  - Diocese of Nogales

=== Ecclesiastical province of Jalapa (Xalapa) ===
- Archdiocese of Jalapa (Xalapa)
  - Diocese of Coatzacoalcos
  - Diocese of Córdoba
  - Diocese of Orizaba
  - Diocese of Papantla
  - Diocese of San Andrés Tuxtla
  - Diocese of Tuxpan
  - Diocese of Veracruz

=== Ecclesiastical province of the Bajío ===
- Archdiocese of León
  - Diocese of Celaya
  - Diocese of Irapuato
  - Diocese of Querétaro

=== Ecclesiastical province of México ===
- Archdiocese of Mexico
  - Diocese of Azcapotzalco
  - Diocese of Iztapalapa
  - Diocese of Xochimilco

=== Ecclesiastical province of Monterrey ===
- Archdiocese of Monterrey
  - Diocese of Ciudad Victoria
  - Diocese of Linares
  - Diocese of Matamoros-Reynosa
  - Diocese of Nuevo Laredo
  - Diocese of Piedras Negras
  - Diocese of Saltillo
  - Diocese of Tampico

=== Ecclesiastical province of Morelia ===
- Archdiocese of Morelia
  - Diocese of Apatzingan
  - Diocese of Ciudad Lázaro Cárdenas
  - Diocese of Tacámbaro
  - Diocese of Zamora

=== Ecclesiastical province of Puebla de los Angeles ===
- Archdiocese of Puebla de los Angeles
  - Diocese of Huajuapan de León
  - Diocese of Tehuacán
  - Diocese of Tlaxcala

=== Ecclesiastical province of San Luis Potosí ===
- Archdiocese of San Luis Potosí
  - Diocese of Ciudad Valles
  - Diocese of Matehuala
  - Diocese of Zacatecas

=== Ecclesiastical province of Tijuana ===
- Archdiocese of Tijuana
  - Diocese of Ensenada
  - Diocese of La Paz en la Baja California Sur
  - Diocese of Mexicali

=== Ecclesiastical province of Tlalnepantla ===
- Archdiocese of Tlalnepantla
  - Diocese of Cuautitlán
  - Diocese of Ecatepec
  - Diocese of Netzahualcóyotl
  - Diocese of Teotihuacán
  - Diocese of Texcoco
  - Diocese of Valle de Chalco
  - Diocese of Izcalli

=== Ecclesiastical province of Toluca ===
- Archdiocese of Toluca
  - Diocese of Atlacomulco de Fabela
  - Diocese of Cuernavaca
  - Diocese of Tenancingo

=== Ecclesiastical province of Tulancingo ===
- Archdiocese of Tulancingo
  - Diocese of Huejutla
  - Diocese of Tula

=== Ecclesiastical province of Tuxtla Gutiérrez ===
- Archdiocese of Tuxtla Gutiérrez
  - Diocese of San Cristóbal de Las Casas
  - Diocese of Tapachula

=== Ecclesiastical province of Yucatán ===
- Archdiocese of Yucatán
  - Diocese of Campeche
  - Diocese of Tabasco
  - Diocese of Cancún-Chetumal

== Gallery of Episcopal Sees ==
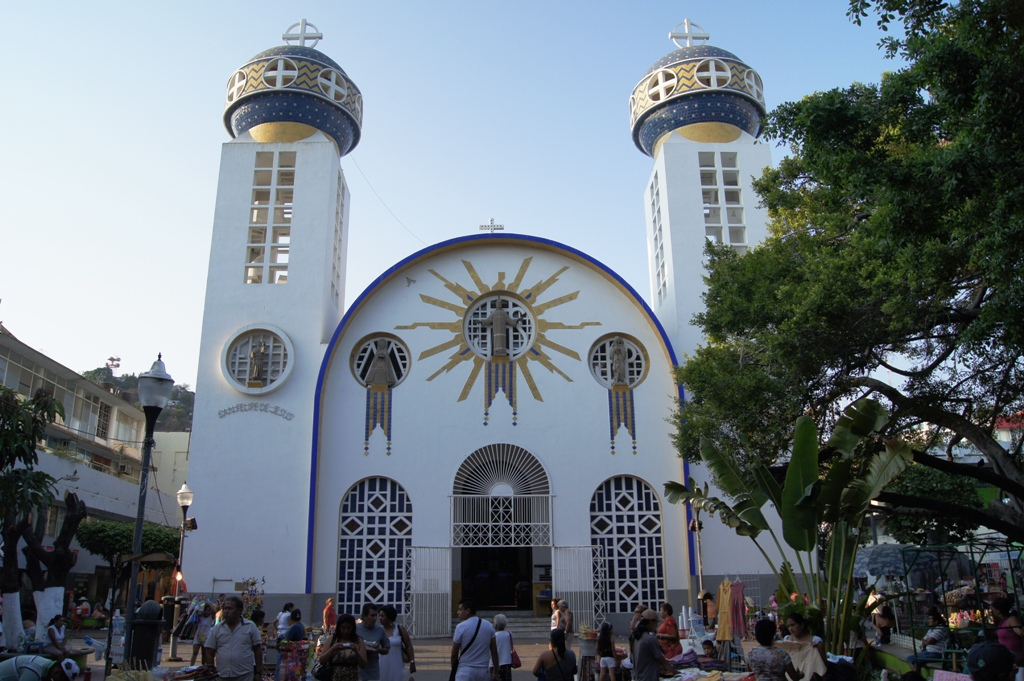
The seat of the Archdiocese of Acapulco is Catedral de Nuestra Señora de la Soledad.

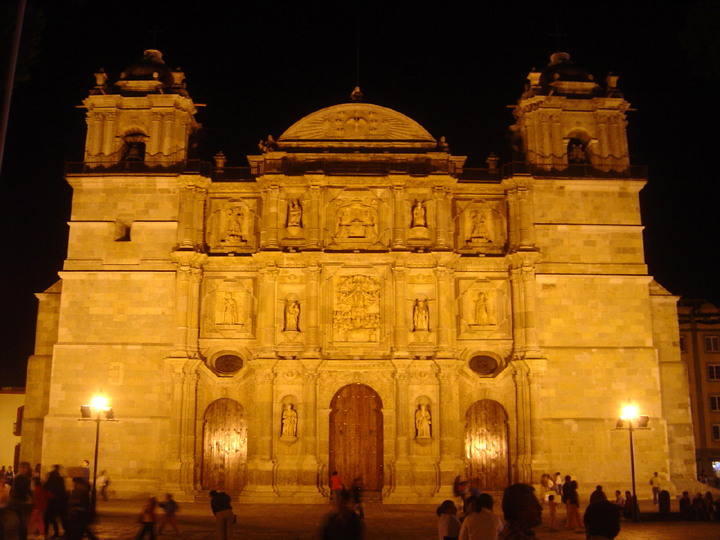
The seat of the Archdiocese of Antequera is Catedral Metropolitana de Nuestra Señora de la Asunción.

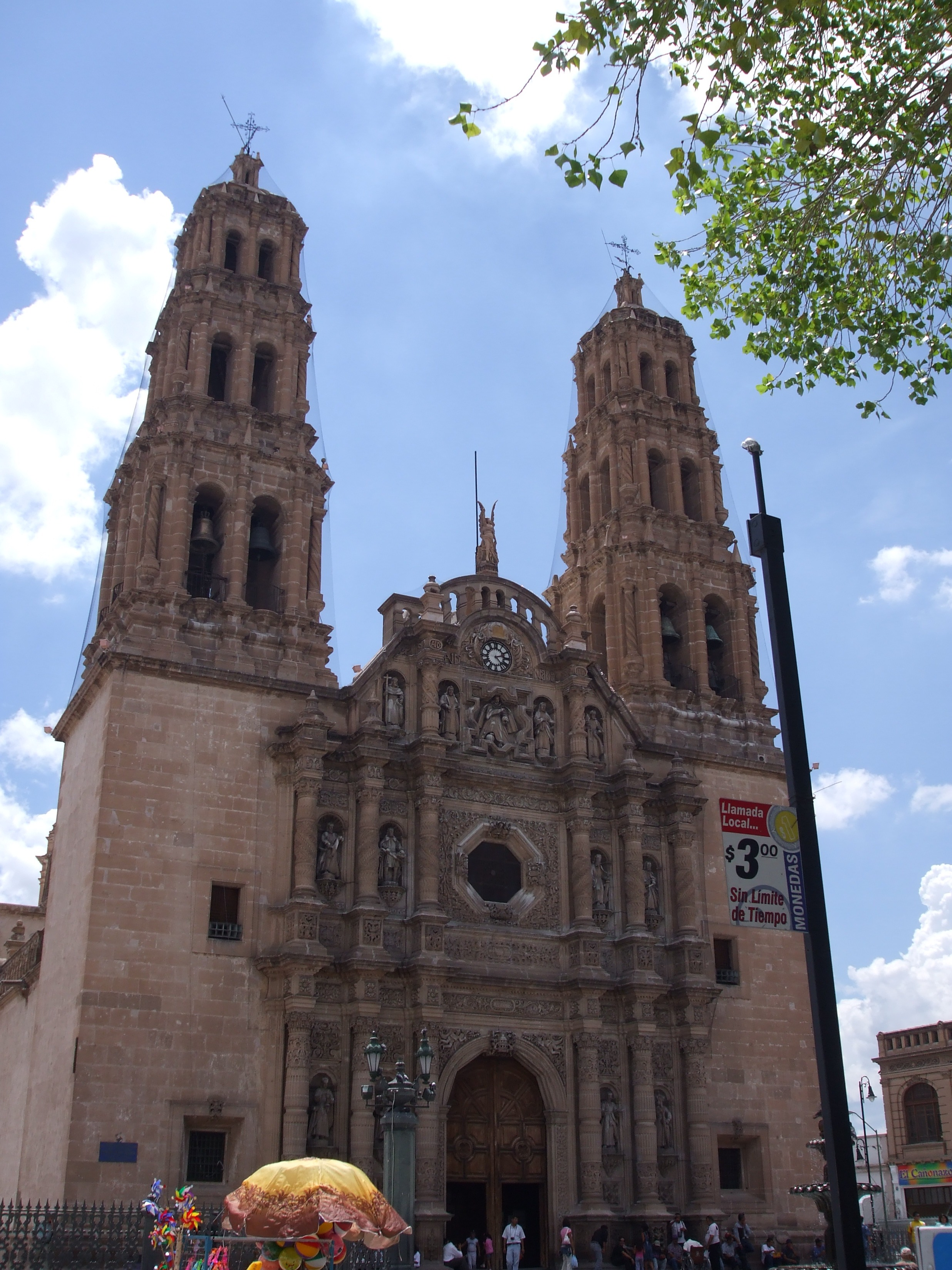
The seat of the Archdiocese of Chihuahua is Catedral Metropolitana de Chihuahua.

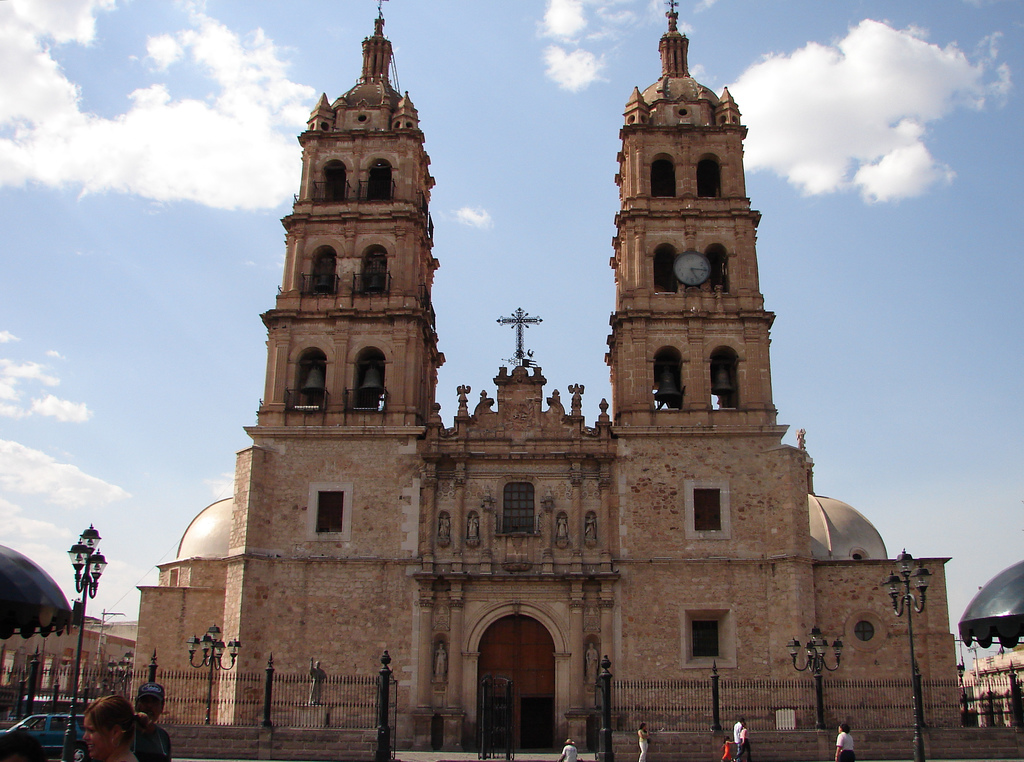
The seat of the Archdiocese of Durango is Catedral Basílica de Nuestra Señora.

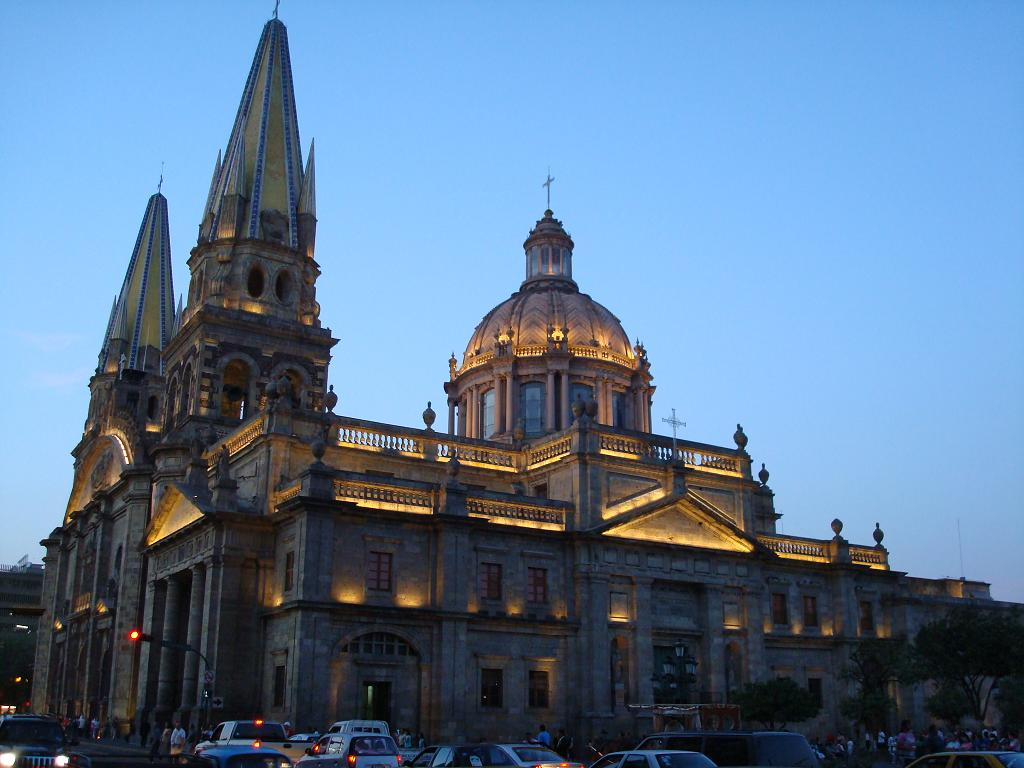
The seat of the Archdiocese of Guadalajara is Catedral de la Asunción de María Santísima.

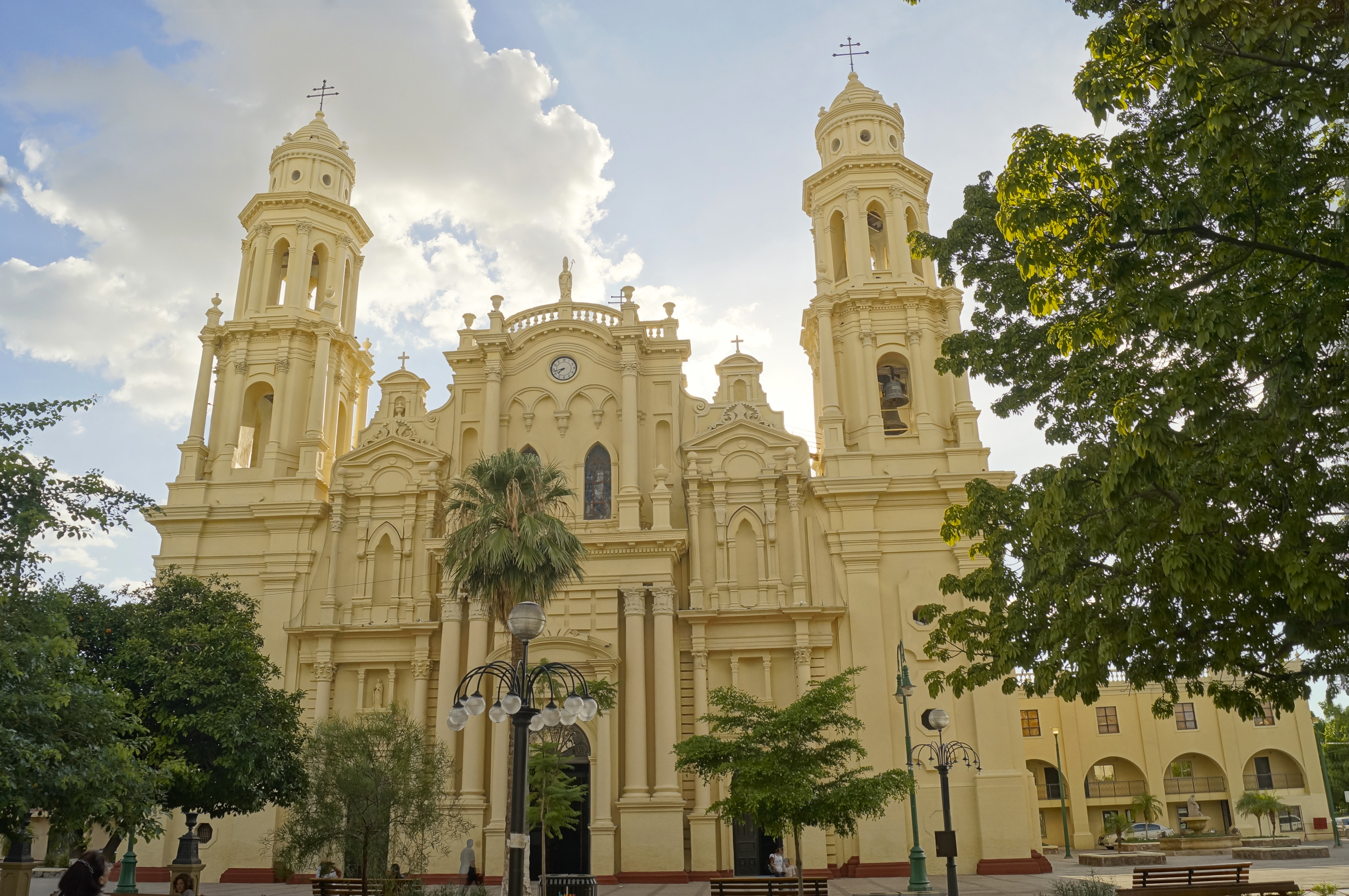
The seat of the Archdiocese of Hermosillo is Catedral de la Ascunsión.

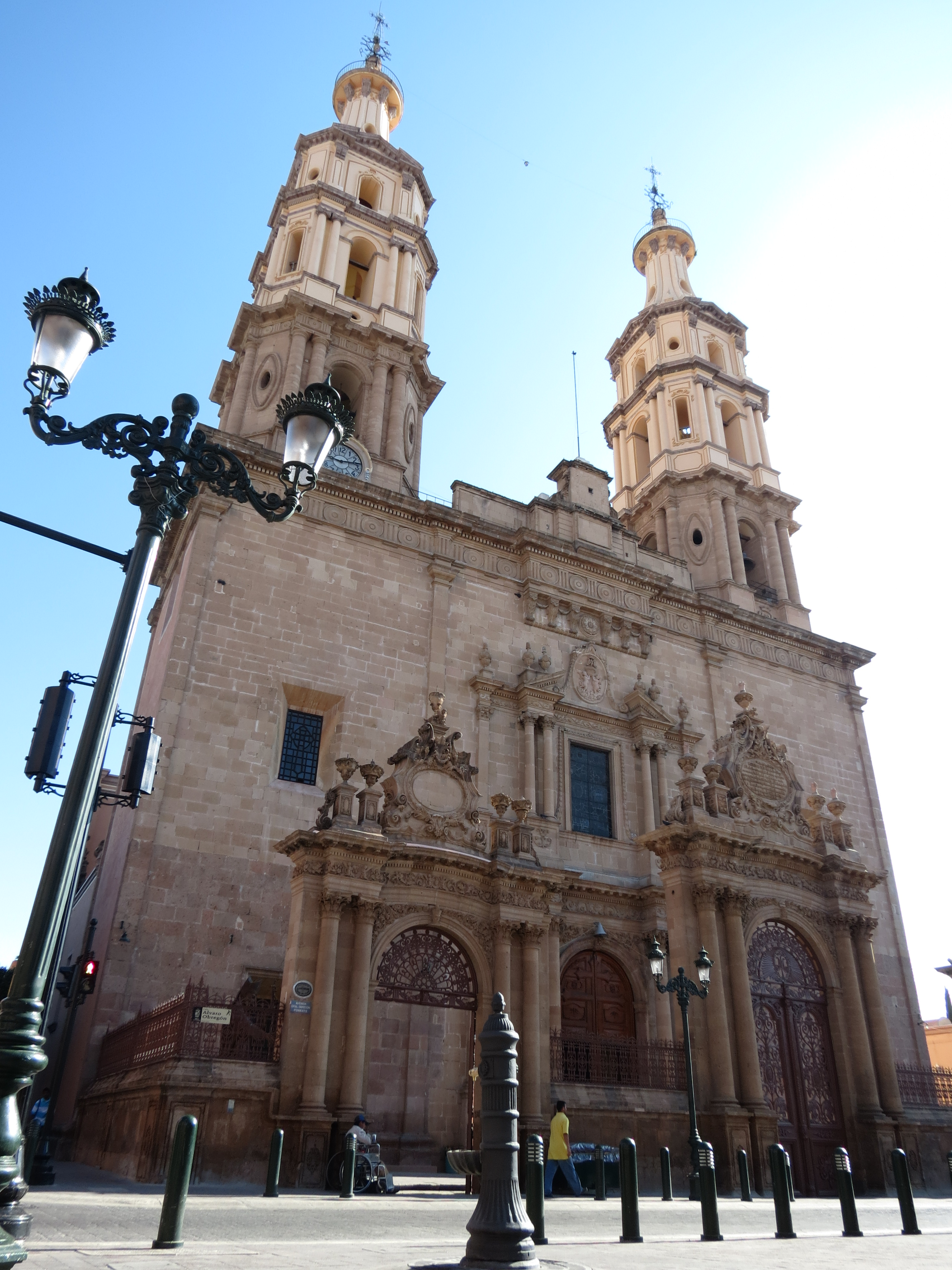
The seat of the Archdiocese of León is Catedral Basílica de Nuestra Señora de la Luz.

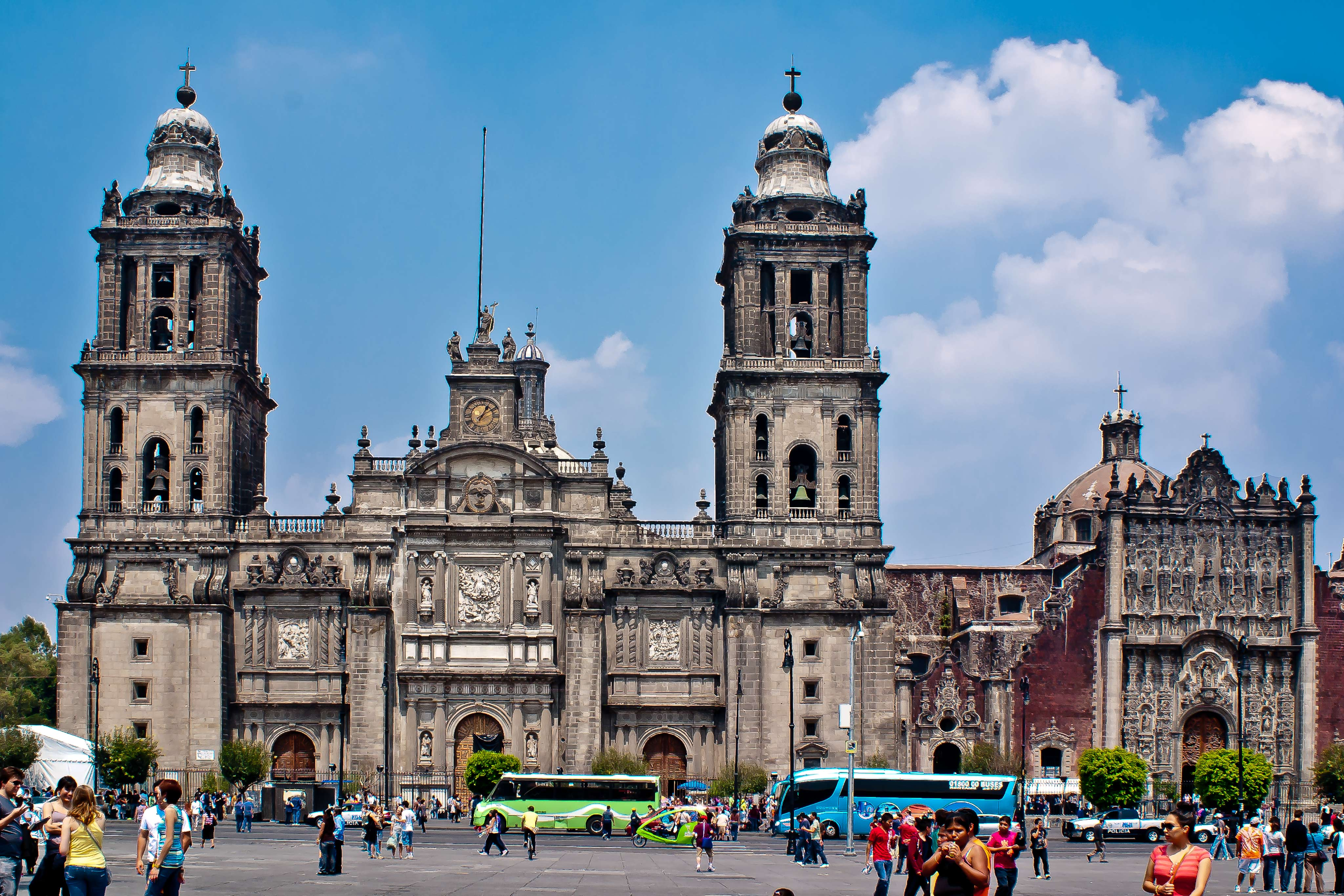
The seat of the Archdiocese of Mexico City is Catedral Metropolitana de la Asunción de María.

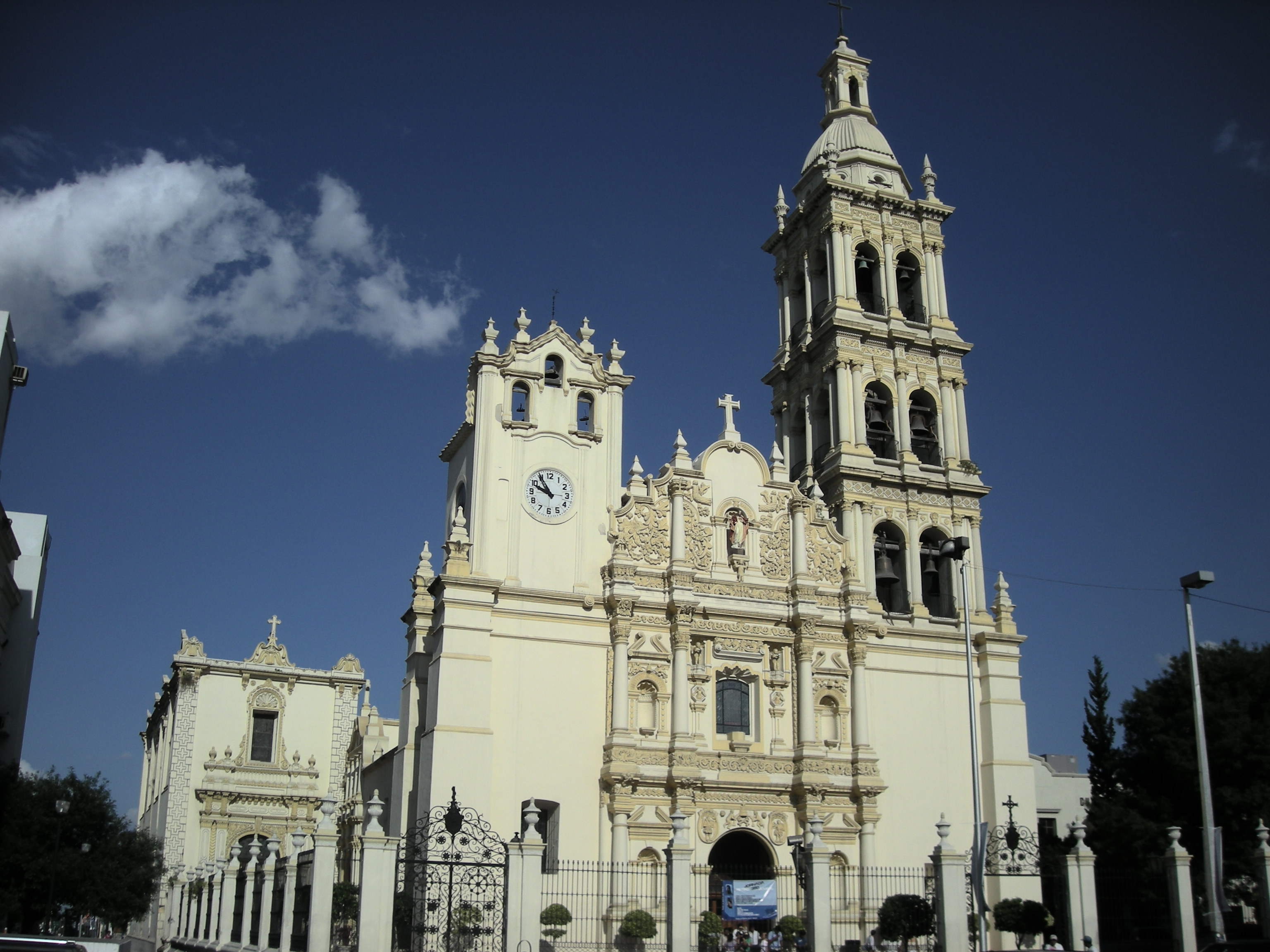
The seat of the Archdiocese of Monterrey is Catedral Metropolitana de Nuestra Señora de Monterrey.

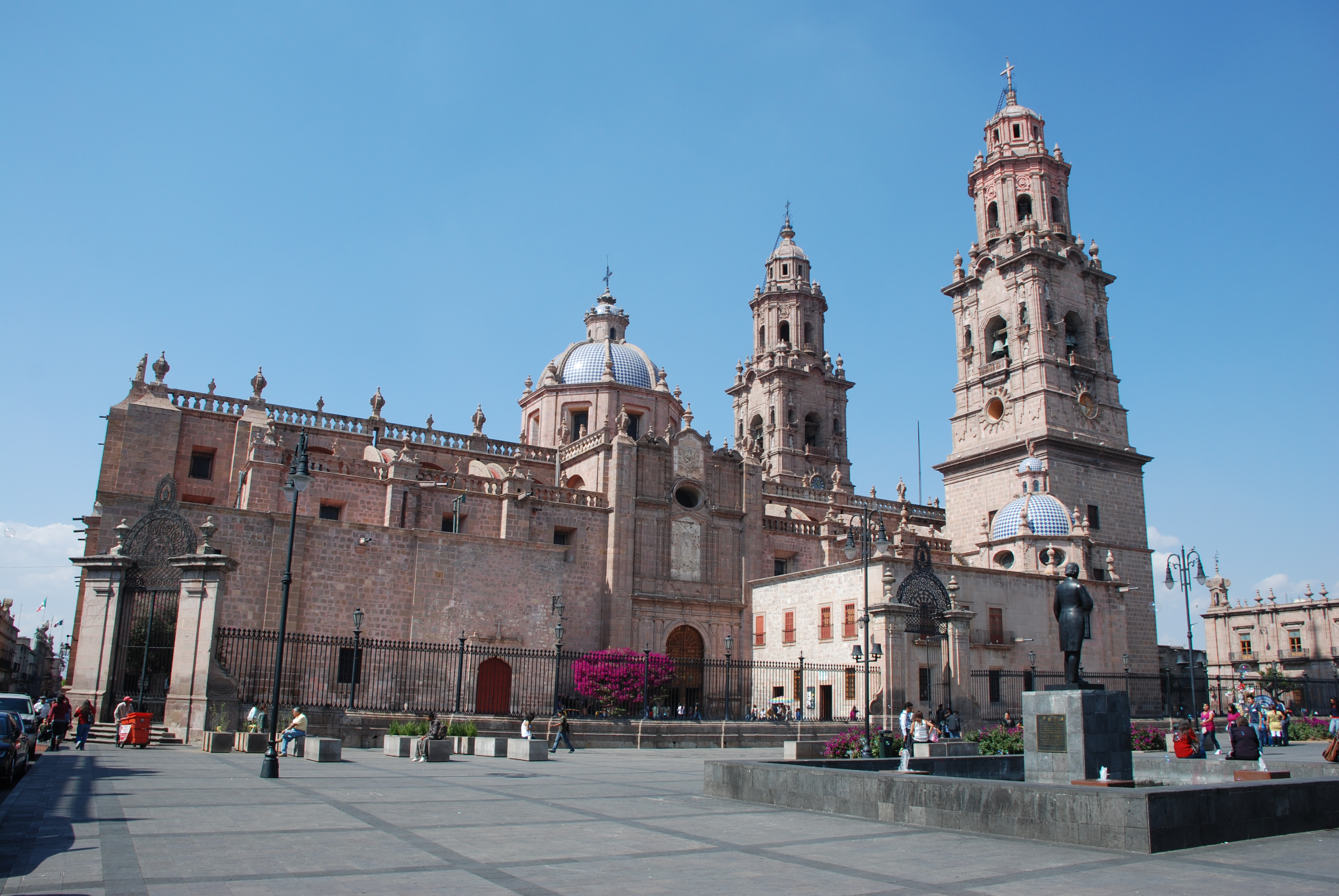
The seat of the Archdiocese of Morelia is Catedral de San Salvador.

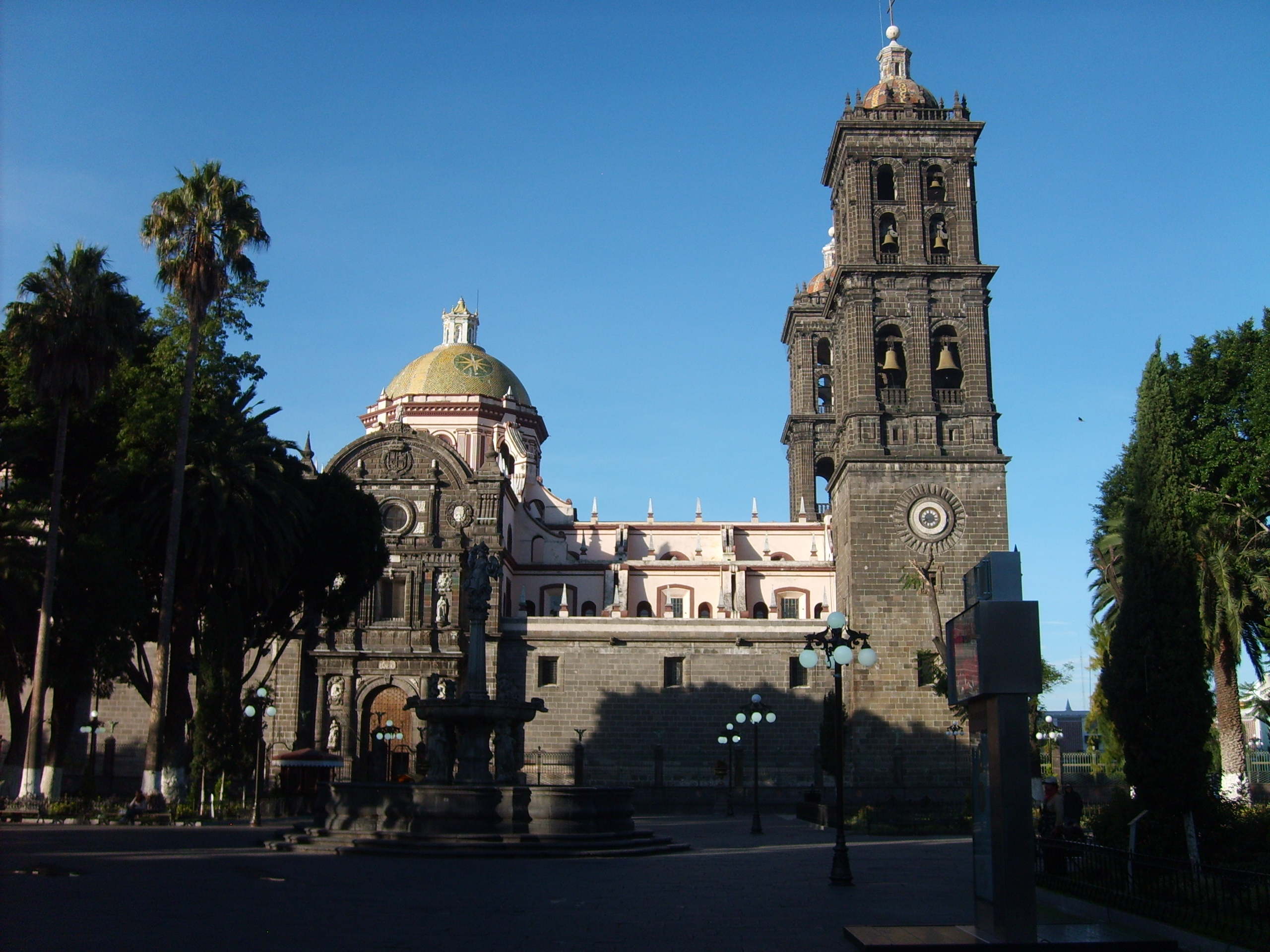
The seat of the Archdiocese of Puebla de los Angeles is Catedral Metropolitana de Nuestra Señora de la Purísima Concepción.

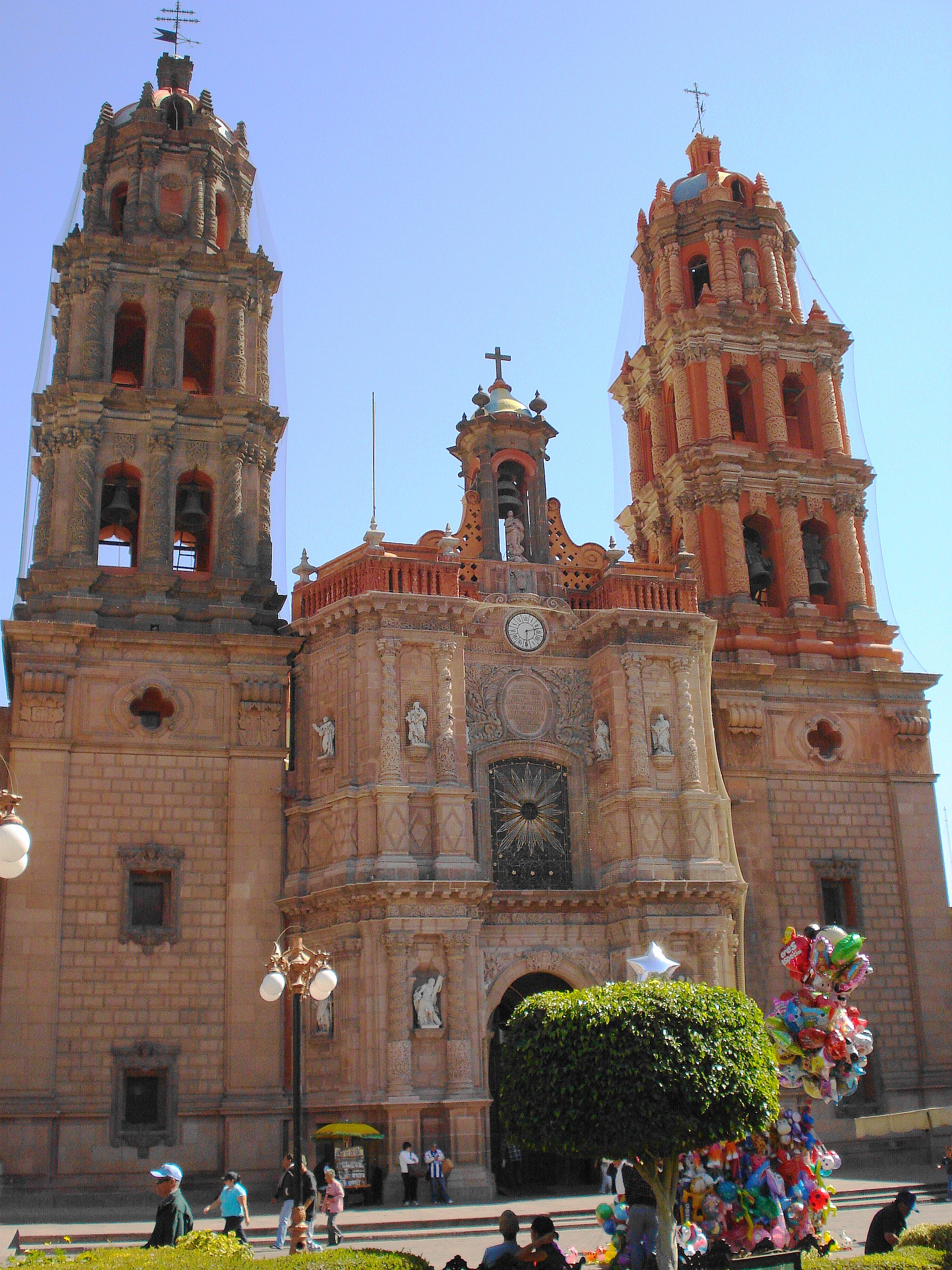
The seat of the Archdiocese of San Luis Potosí is Catedral Metropolitana de San Luis Rey.

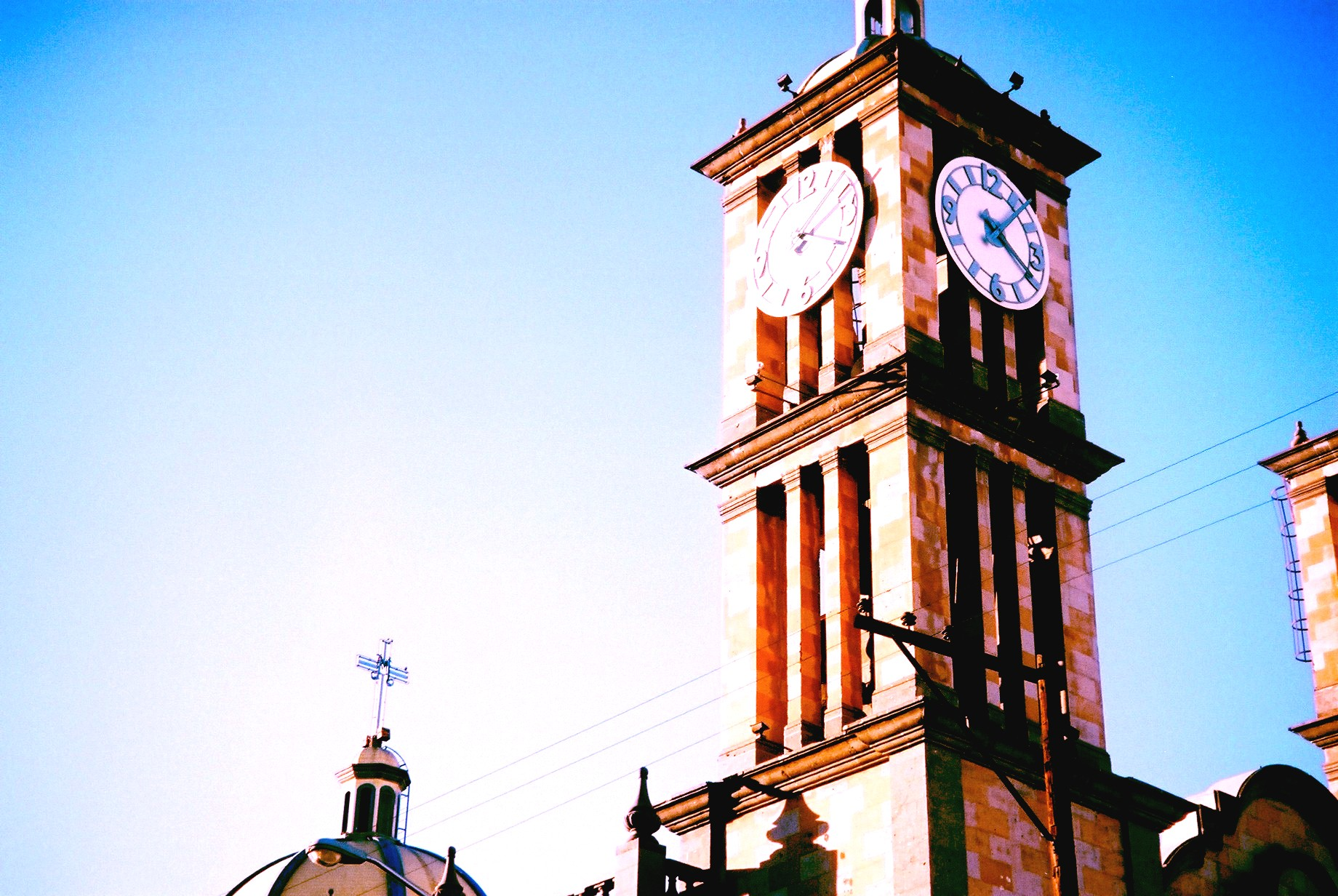
The seat of the Archdiocese of Tijuana is Catedral de Nuestra Señora de Guadalupe.

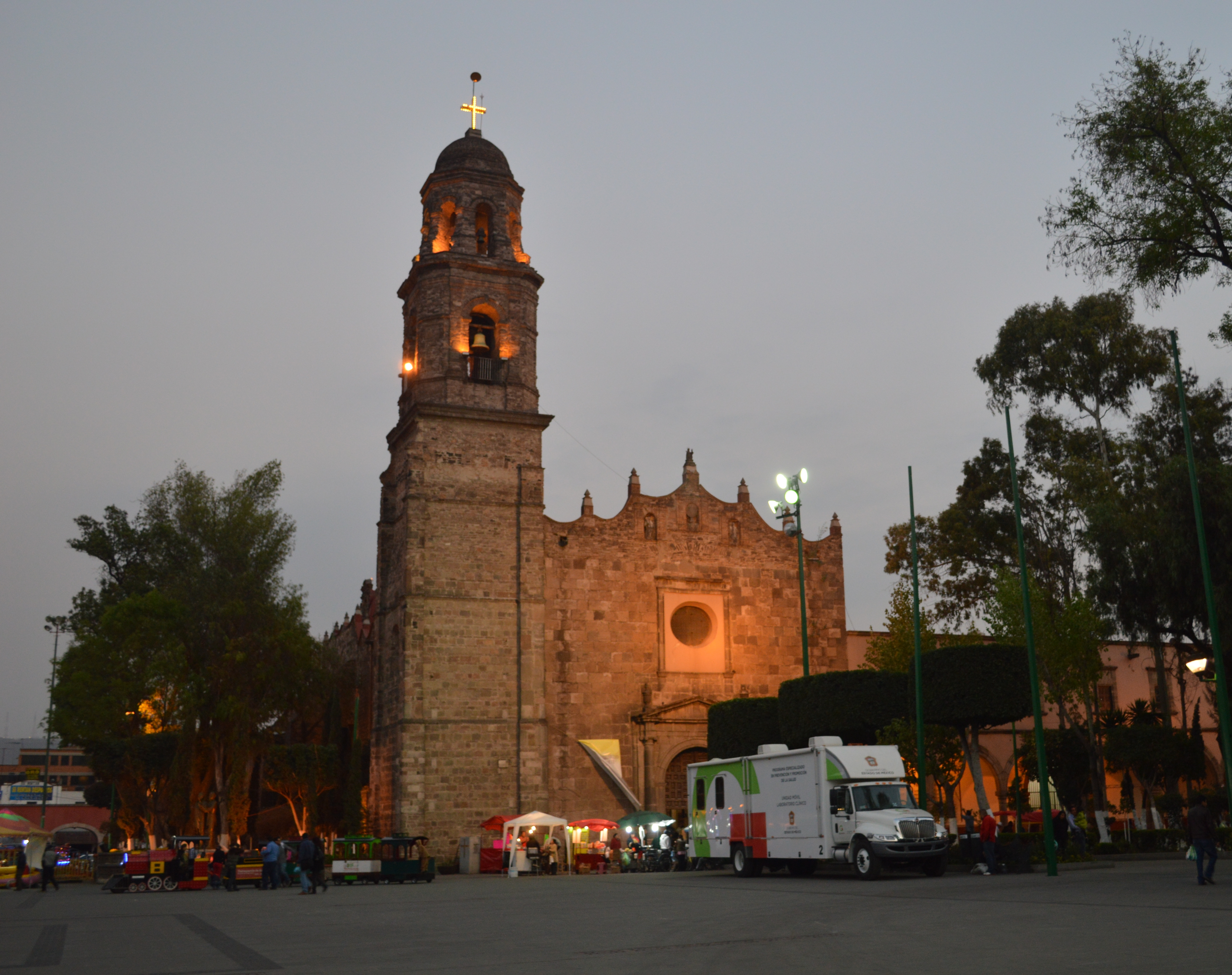
The seat of the Archdiocese of Tlalnepantla is Catedral de Corpus Christi.

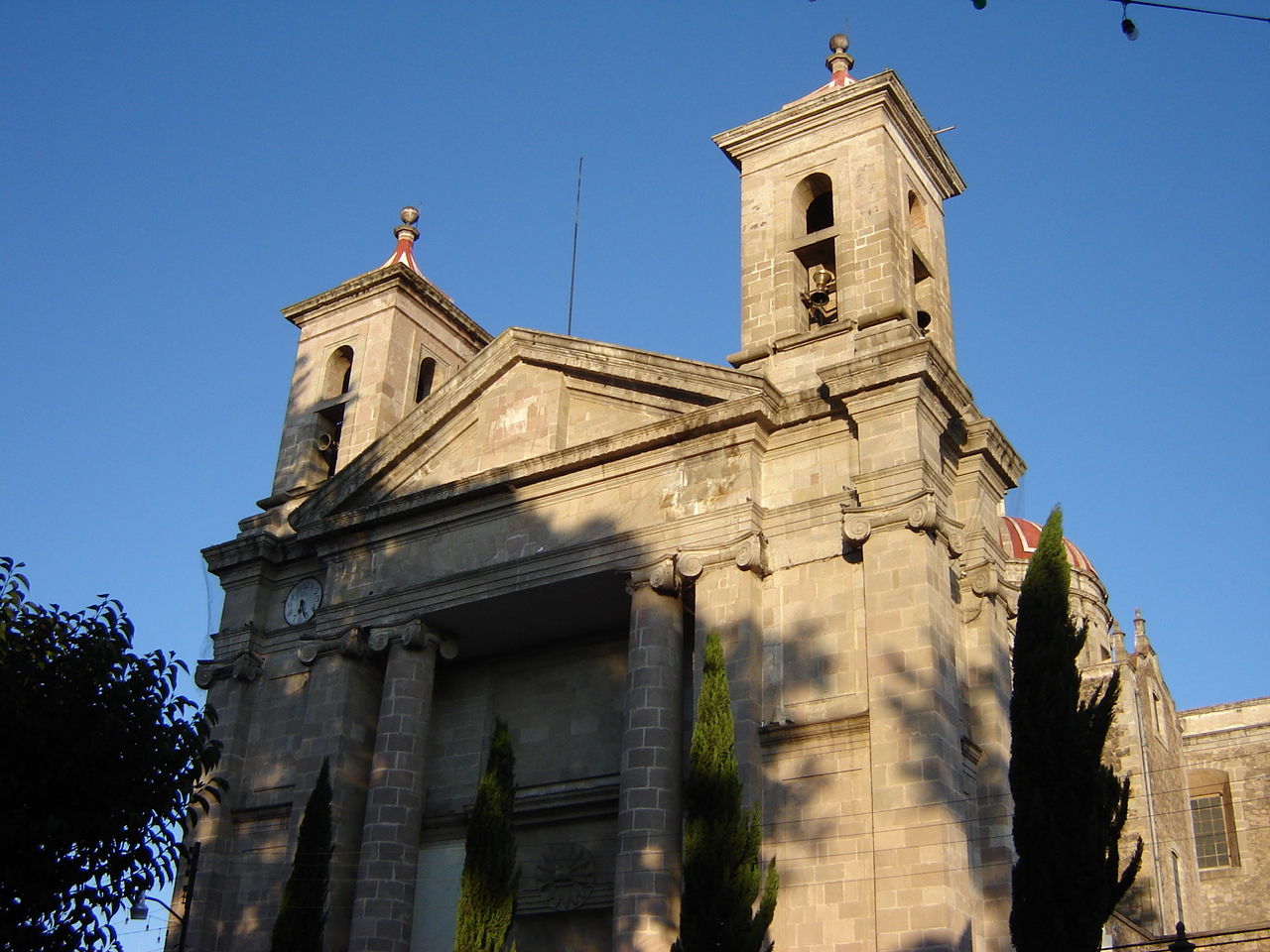
The seat of the Archdiocese of Tulancingo is Catedral de San Juan Bautista.

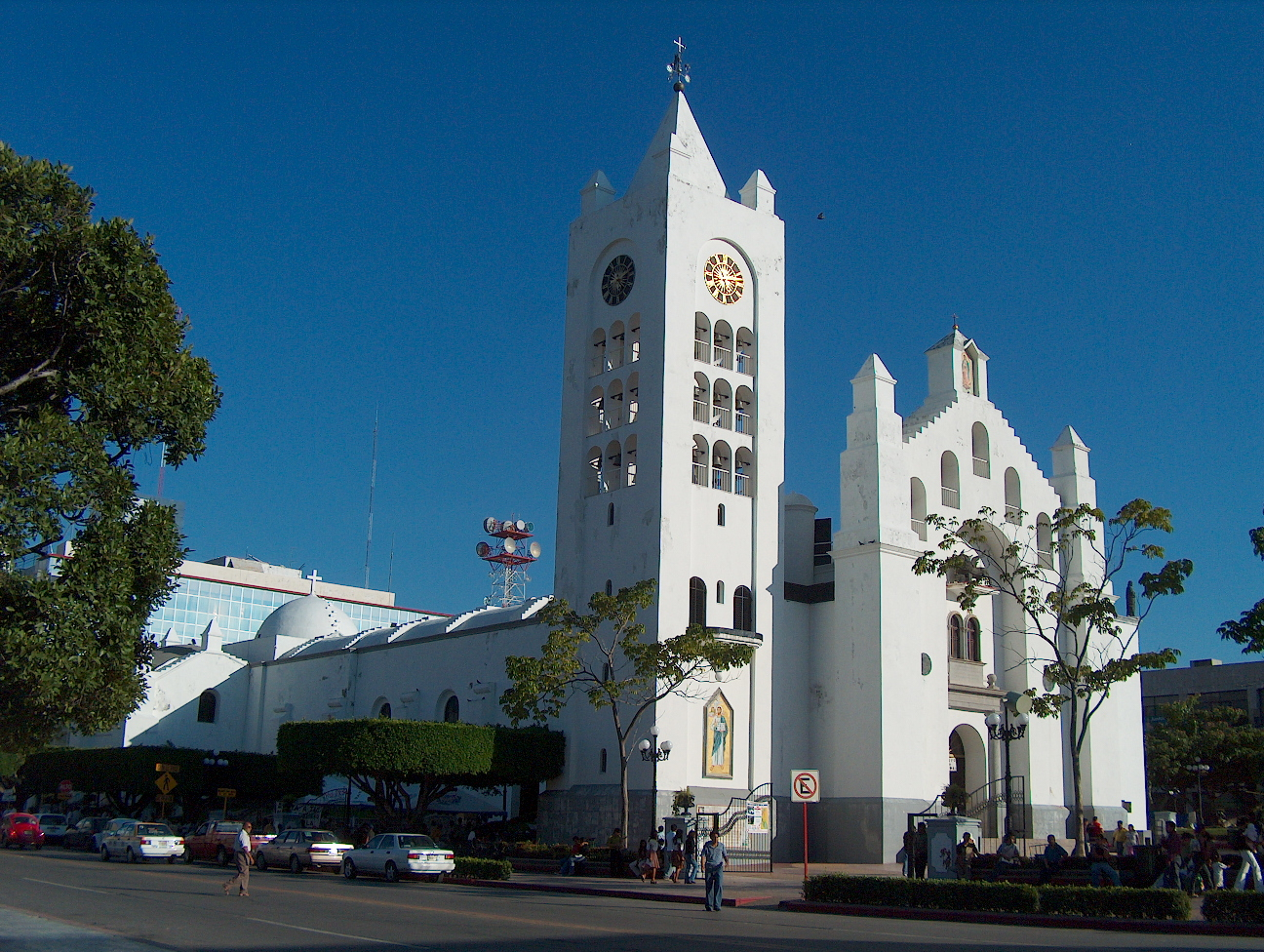
The seat of the Archdiocese of Tuxtla Gutiérrez is Catedral de San Marcos.

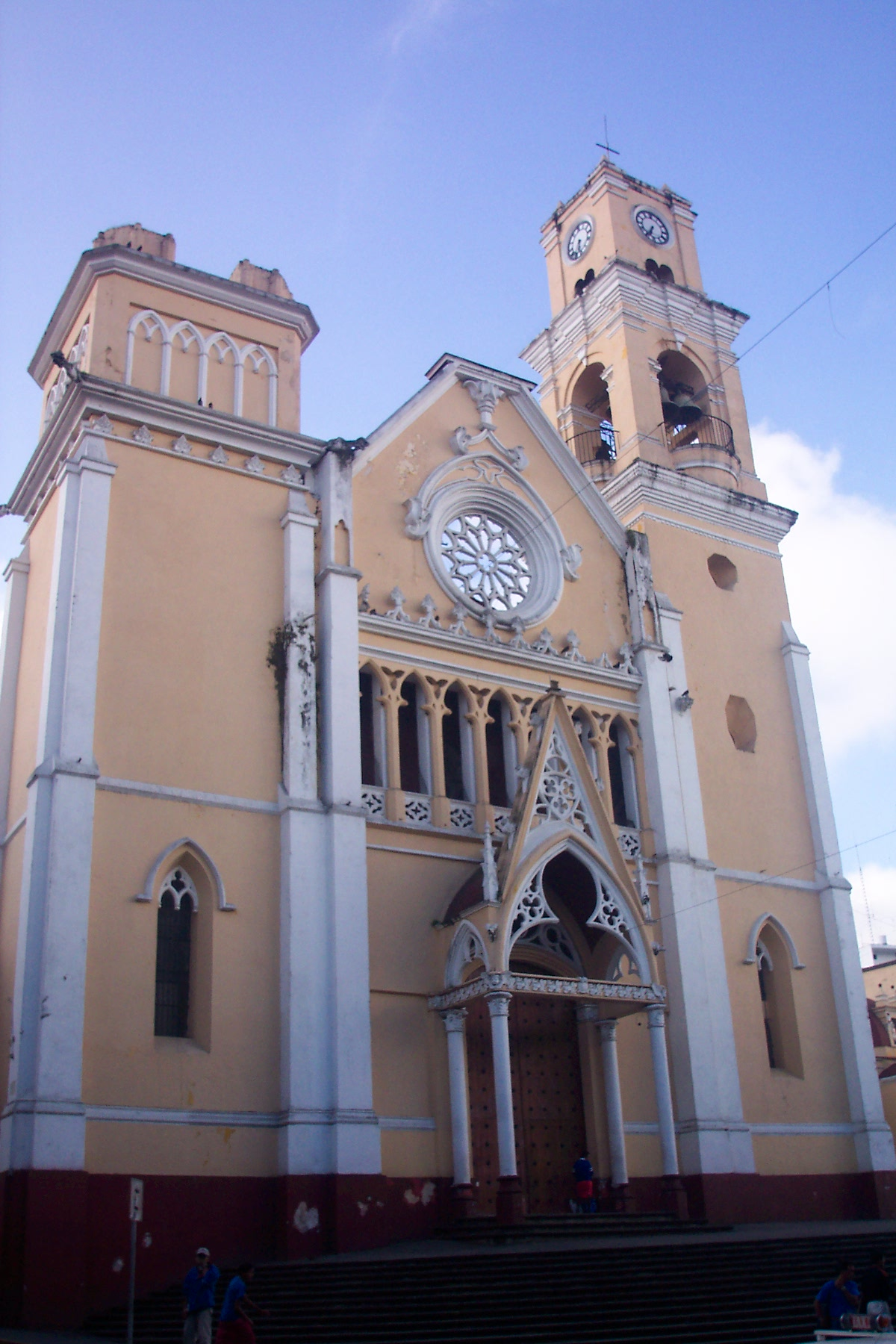
The seat of the Archdiocese of Xalapa is Catedral Metropolitana de la Immaculada Concepción.

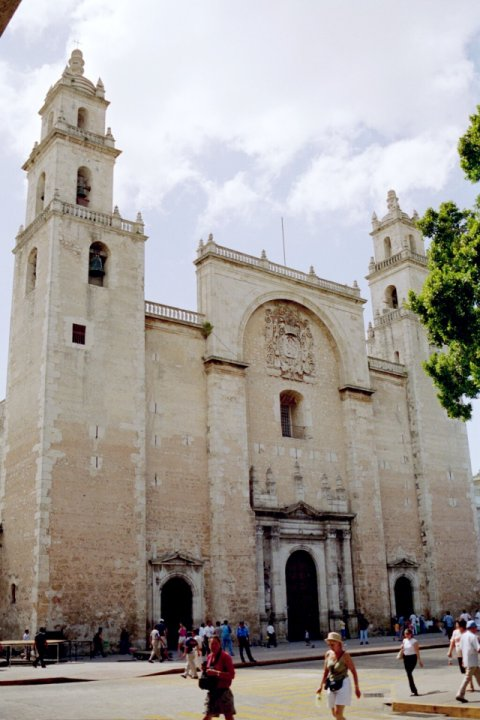
The seat of the Archdiocese of Yucatán is Catedral Metropolitana de San Ildefonso.
