= Onésimo Cepeda Silva =

Mexican Roman Catholic prelate (1937–2022)

- Bishop of Ecatepec
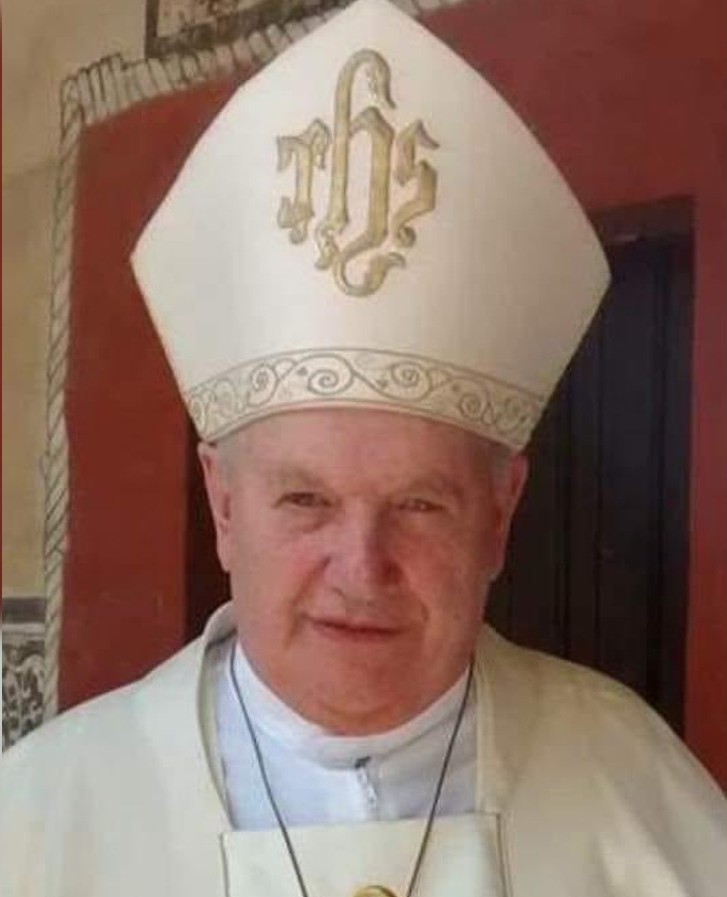
- Church: Latin Church
- Archdiocese: Archdiocese of Tlalnepantla
- Diocese: Diocese of Ecatepec
- Appointed: 28 June 1995
- Retired: 7 May 2012

Orders
- Ordination: 28 October 1970 by Sergio Méndez Arceo
- Consecration: 12 August 1995 by Girolamo Prigione

Personal details
- Born: 25 March 1937 Mexico City, Mexico
- Died: 31 January 2022 (aged 84) Mexico City, Mexico

Onésimo Cepeda Silva (25 March 1937 – 31 January 2022) He was also a Mexican Catholic bishop. He was the first bishop of Ecatepec, serving from 1999 until his resignation in 2012 was a Mexican Roman Catholic prelate.

He was bishop of Ecatepec from 1995 to 2012.

He died from complications of COVID-19 in Mexico City on 31 January 2022, at the age of 84.
