= Roman Catholic Diocese of Texcoco =

Roman Catholic diocese in Mexico

Diocese of Texcoco Dioecesis Texcocensis Diócesis de Texcoco
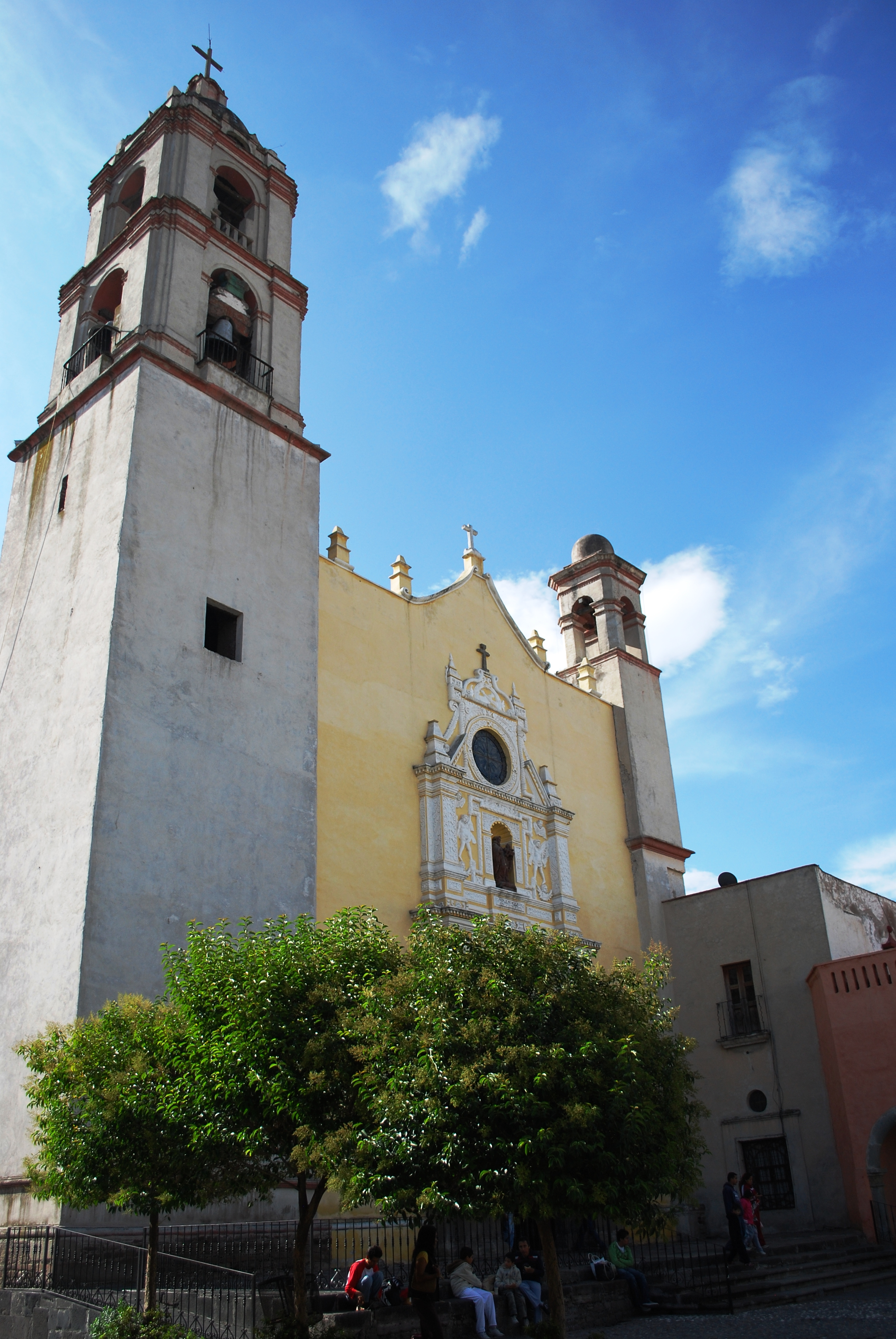
- Catedral de la Inmaculada Concepción

Location
- Country: Mexico
- Ecclesiastical province: Province of Tlalnepantla
- Metropolitan: Tlalnepantla

Statistics
- Area: 439 sq mi (1,140 km^{2})
- Population: Total; Catholics: (as of 2010); 1,605,000; 1,442,534 (89.9%)
- Parishes: 60

Information
- Denomination: Roman Catholic
- Rite: Roman Rite
- Established: 30 April 1960 (66 years ago)
- Cathedral: Cathedral of the Immaculate Conception

Current leadership
- Pope: Leo XIV
- Bishop: Carlos Enrique Samaniego López
- Bishops emeritus: Juan Manuel Mancilla Sánchez

Map
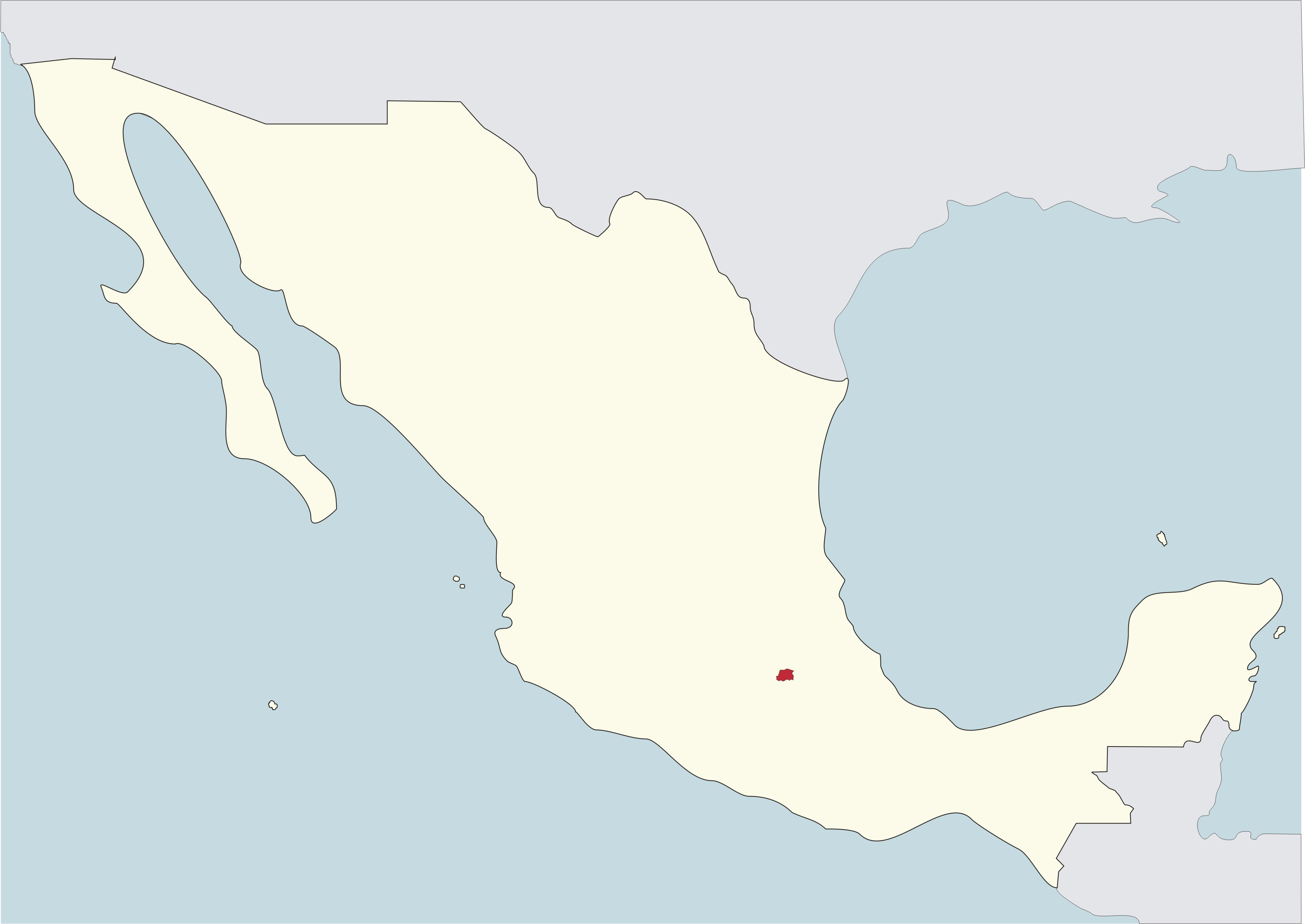

The Roman Catholic Diocese of Texcoco (Latin: Dioecesis Texcocensis) (erected 30 April 1960) is a suffragan diocese of the Archdiocese of Tlalnepantla.

== Bishops ==
=== Ordinaries ===
- Francisco Ferreira Arreola (1960–1977)
- Magín Camerino Torreblanca Reyes (1978–1997)
- Carlos Aguiar Retes (1997–2009), appointed Archbishop of Tlalnepantla; elevated to Cardinal in 2016
- Juan Manuel Mancilla Sánchez (2009–2025)
- Carlos Enrique Samaniego López (2025–)

=== Auxiliary bishops ===
- Magín Camerino Torreblanca Reyes (1972-1978), appointed Bishop here
- Juan Manuel Mancilla Sánchez (2001-2005), appointed Bishop of Ciudad Obregón, Sonora (later returned to this diocese as Bishop)

=== Other priests of this diocese who became bishops ===
- Luis Artemio Flores Calzada, appointed Bishop of Valle de Chalco, México in 2003
- Víctor René Rodríguez Gómez, appointed Bishop of Valle de Chalco, México in 2012
- Guillermo Francisco Escobar Galicia, appointed Bishop of Teotihuacán, México in 2008
- Jorge Cuapio Bautista, appointed Auxiliary Bishop of Tlalnepantla, México in 2015

== Territorial losses ==
Year	Along with	To form
1964	Archdiocese of México	Diocese of Tlalnepantla
1979	Diocese of Tlalnepantla	Diocese of Cuautitlán
1979		Diocese of Netzahualcóyotl
1995	Archdiocese of Tlalnepantla	Diocese of Ecatepec

== External links and references ==
- "Diocese of Texcoco". Catholic-Hierarchy.
