= Ricardo Guízar Díaz =

- Archbishop of Tlalnepantla
- Church: Catholic Church
- Archdiocese: Archdiocese of Tlalnepantla
- In office: 14 August 1996 – 5 February 2009
- Predecessor: Manuel Pérez-Gil y González
- Successor: Carlos Aguiar Retes
- Previous posts: Bishop of Atlacomulco (1984-1996); Auxiliary Bishop of Aguascalientes (1977-1984); Titular Bishop of Nona (1970-1984); Auxiliary Bishop of Puebla de los Ángeles (1970-1977)

Orders
- Ordination: 26 October 1958
- Consecration: 24 August 1970 by Octaviano Márquez y Toriz

Personal details
- Born: 26 February 1933 Colonia del Valle, Mexico City, Mexico
- Died: 4 December 2015 (aged 82)

Ricardo Guízar Díaz (26 February 1933 – 4 December 2015) was a Roman Catholic prelate. He served as the bishop of the Roman Catholic Diocese of Atlacomulco from 1984 to 1996 and the Archbishop of the Roman Catholic Archdiocese of Tlalnepantla from 1996 to 2009.

Ordained to the priesthood in 1958, Guíza Díaz was appointed auxiliary bishop of the Roman Catholic Diocese of Puebla de los Ángeles, Mexico in 1979. He was then appointed Bishop of the Roman Catholic Diocese of Altacomulco and then archbishop of the Roman Catholic Archdiocese of Tlalnepantla.
