= Santi Fabiano e Venanzio a Villa Fiorelli =

- Church of Saints Fabian and Venantius by Villa Fiorelli
- Chiesa dei Santi Fabiano e Venanzio a Villa Fiorelli
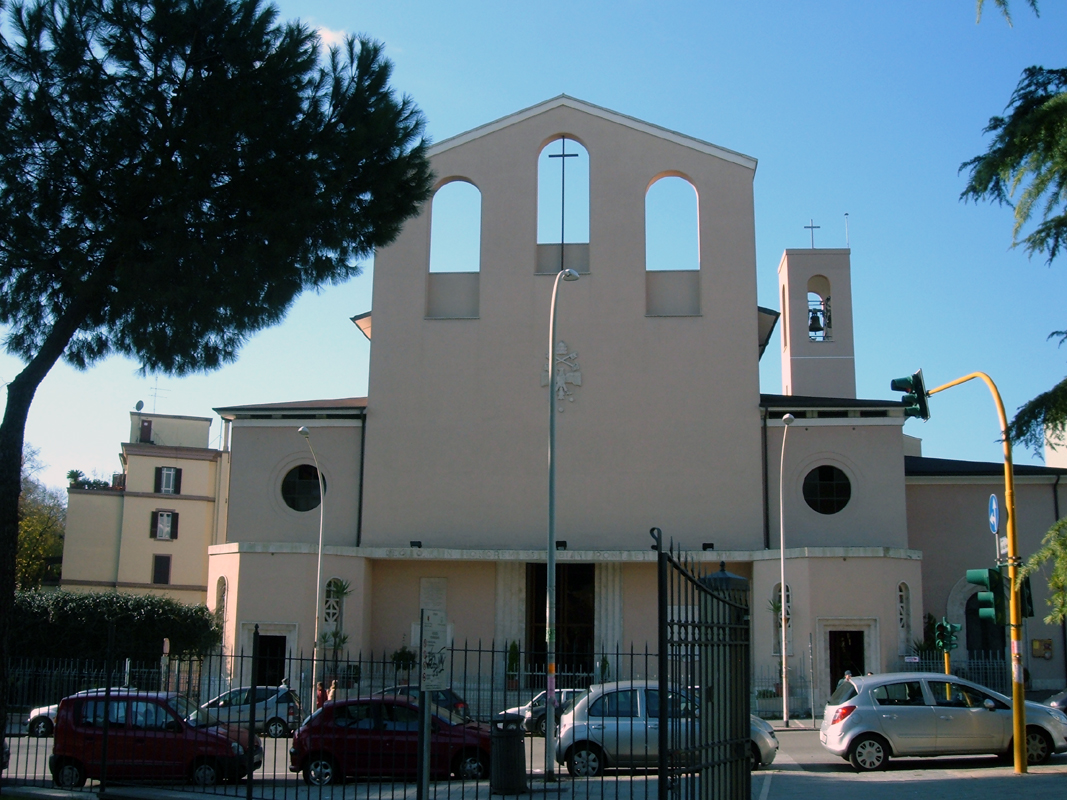
- Click on the map for a fullscreen view
- 41°53′05″N 12°31′18″E
- Location: Via Terni 92, Rome
- Country: Italy
- Language: Italian
- Denomination: Catholic
- Tradition: Roman Rite
- Website: web.tiscali.it/SSfabianoevenanzio/

History
- Status: regional church, titular church
- Founded: 1936
- Dedication: Pope Fabian and Venantius of Camerino
- Consecrated: 1959

Architecture
- Architect: Clemente Busciri Vici

Administration
- Diocese: Rome

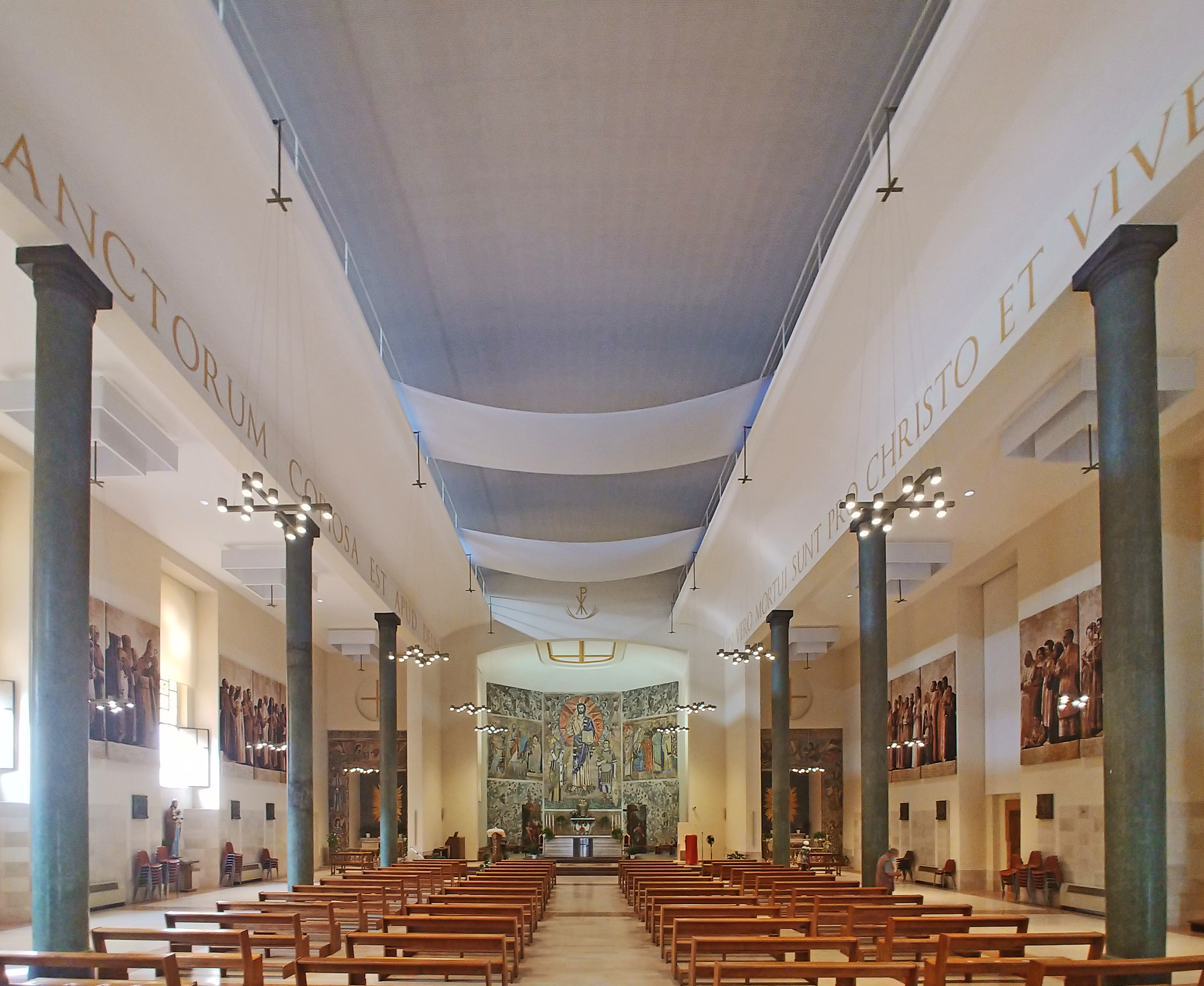
View of interior

Santi Fabiano e Venanzio a Villa Fiorelli is a church on Via Terni, Rome. The parish was set up by Pope Pius XI, and the church opened for worship as the regional church of the Camerino region (served by diocesan clergy) in 1936. It was designed by Clemente Busciri Vici, with 3 naves, narrow side-aisles and a slightly slanting roof.

Pope Pius XII visited the church on 13 August 1943, the date of the second air bombardment of Rome, and two stones (along with a bronze door decorated with symbols of air warfare) commemorate this event and the names of bomb-victims in the parish. However, it was not formally consecrated until 1959 by Bishop Luigi Traglia.

== Cardinal-priests ==
- Hermann Volk (1973–1988)
- Ján Chryzostom Korec (1991–2015)
- Carlos Aguiar Retes (2016–present)
