= Hermenegildo Ramírez Sánchez =

Mexican Roman Catholic prelate (1929–2022)

Most Reverend Hermenegildo Ramírez Sánchez, M.J.
- Territorial Prelate of Huautla
- Church: Roman Catholic Church
- Appointed: 4 January 1975
- Retired: 15 October 2005
- Predecessor: New Creation
- Successor: Héctor Luis Morales Sánchez
- Other post: Titular Bishop of Santa Giusta (1975–1978)

Orders
- Ordination: 5 July 1953 (Priest)
- Consecration: 19 March 1975 (Bishop) by Mario Pio Gaspari

Personal details
- Born: Hermenegildo Ramírez Sánchez; 13 April 1929 Mexico City, Mexico
- Died: 29 January 2022 (aged 92) Querétaro City, Mexico

Hermenegildo Ramírez Sánchez, M.J. (13 April 1929 – 29 January 2022) was a Mexican Roman Catholic prelate.

== Life ==
Ramírez Sánchez entered the Congregation of the Missionaries of Saint Joseph and made his profession on 12 December 1945. He was ordained as priest on 5 July 1953.

Pope Paul VI appointed him on 4 January 1975, the first prelate of Huautla and Titular Bishop of Santa Giusta. The Apostolic Delegate in Mexico, Mario Pio Gaspari, consecrated him on 19 March of the same year in the Cathedral of San Juan Evangelista in Huautla de Jiménez; Co-consecrators were Ernesto Corripio y Ahumada, Archbishop of Antequera, and Braulio Sánchez Fuentes SDB, Prelate of Mixes.

On 15 February 1978, Ramírez Sánchez renounced his titular bishop seat in the course of the new allocation guidelines of the Roman Curia. On 15 October 2005, Pope Benedict XVI accepted his retirement because of the age.

Ramírez Sánchez was hospitalized due to health complications from COVID-19 in San Juan del Río in Querétaro City in January 2022. He died from the virus on 29 January, at the age of 92.
