= José María Hernández González =

- Bishop of Netzahualcóyotl
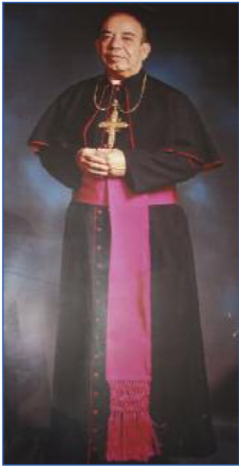
- José María Hernández González in 2012
- Church: Catholic Church
- Diocese: Diocese of Netzahualcóyotl
- In office: 18 November 1989 – 8 July 2003
- Predecessor: José Melgoza Osorio
- Successor: Carlos Garfias Merlos
- Previous posts: Bishop of Chilpancingo-Chilapa (1989); Bishop of Chilapa (1983-1989)

Orders
- Ordination: 25 March 1950
- Consecration: 26 April 1963 by Girolamo Prigione

Personal details
- Born: 17 January 1927 Pénjamo, Guanajuato, Mexico
- Died: 19 January 2015 (aged 88) Celaya, Guanajuato, Mexico

José Maria Hernández González (17 January 1927 – 19 January 2015) was a Catholic bishop.

Ordained to the priesthood in 1950, Hernández González was named bishop of the Diocese of Chilapa, Mexico, in 1983 and then in 1989 was named bishop of Netzahaulcóyotl. He retired in 2003.
