= Territorial Prelature of Huautla =

Latin Catholic jurisdiction in Mexico

Coordinates: 18°07′49″N 96°50′42″W

Territorial Prelature of Huautla Praelatura Territorialis Huautlensis

Location
- Country: Mexico
- Ecclesiastical province: Antequera
- Population: 123,500

Information
- Denomination: Catholic Church
- Sui iuris church: Latin Church
- Rite: Roman Rite
- Established: October 8, 1972

Current leadership
- Pope: Leo XIV
- Prelate: Guadalupe Antonio Ruíz Urquín

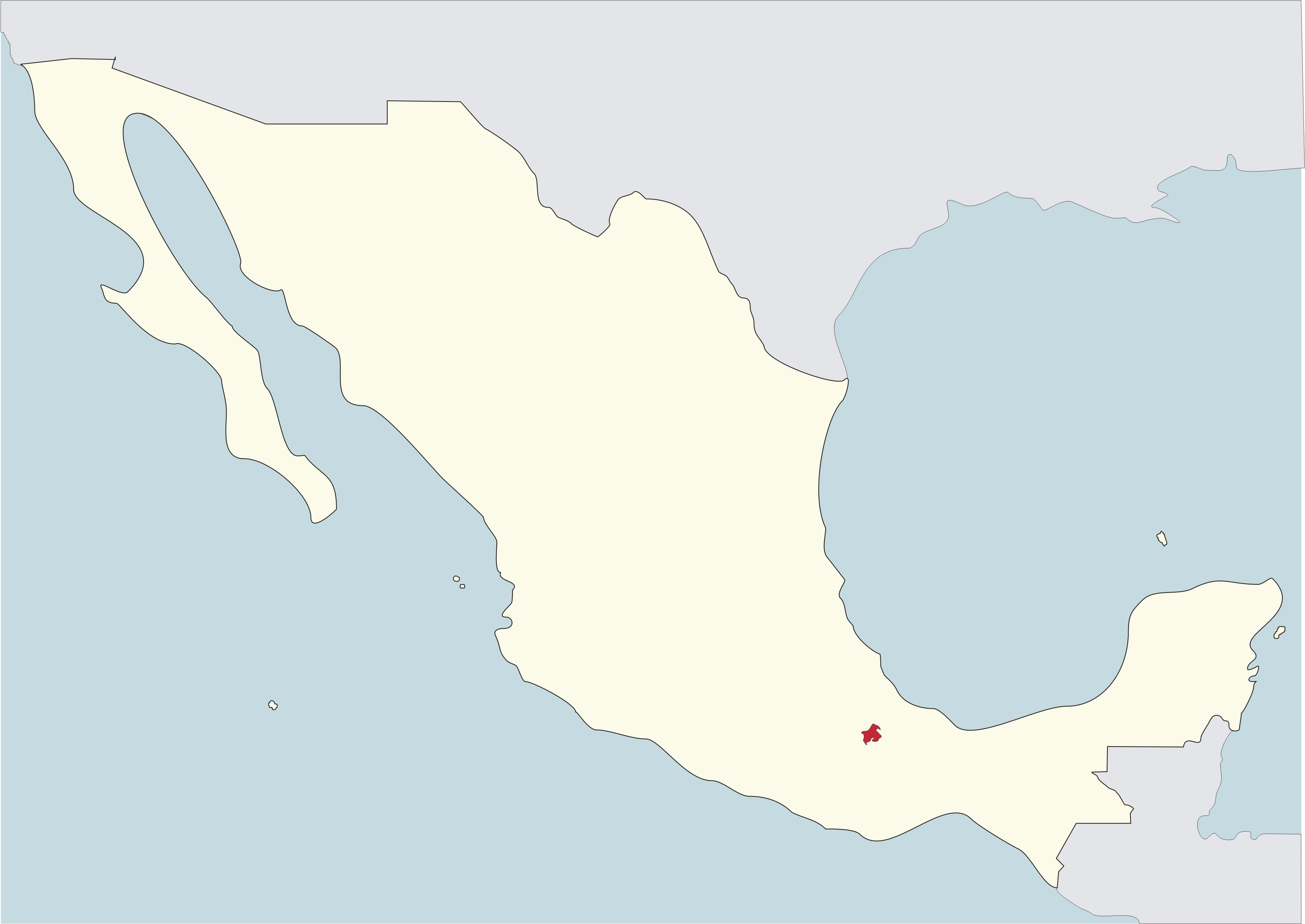

The Territorial Prelature of Huautla (Latin: Praelatura Territorialis Huautlensis) is a Latin Church missionary territory or territorial prelature of the Catholic Church in Mexico. It was erected on 8 October 1972. The diocese is a suffragan in the ecclesiastical province of the metropolitan Antequera.

== Ordinaries ==
- Hermenegildo Ramírez Sánchez, M.J. (1975–2005) – Prelate Emeritus
- Héctor Luis Morales Sánchez (2005–2011), appointed Bishop of Netzahualcóyotl
- José Armando Álvarez Cano (2011–2019), appointed Bishop of Tampico, Tamaulipas
- Guadalupe Antonio Ruíz Urquín (since 2020)

== Territorial losses ==
| Year | Along with | To form |
|---|---|---|
| 1979 | | Diocese of Tuxtepec |
