= Diocese of Teotihuacan =

Roman Catholic diocese in Mexico

Diocese of Teotihuacan Dioecesis Teotihuacana Diócesis de Teotihuacan

Location
- Country: Mexico
- Ecclesiastical province: Province of Tlalnepantla
- Metropolitan: Tlalnepantla

Statistics
- Area: 477 sq mi (1,240 km^{2})
- Population: Total; Catholics: (as of 2010); 866,282; 779,000 (89.9%)
- Parishes: 25

Information
- Denomination: Roman Catholic
- Rite: Roman Rite
- Established: 3 December 2008 (16 years ago)
- Cathedral: Cathedral of St. John the Baptist and the Holy Redeemer

Current leadership
- Pope: Leo XIV
- Bishop: Guillermo Francisco Escobar Galicia

Map
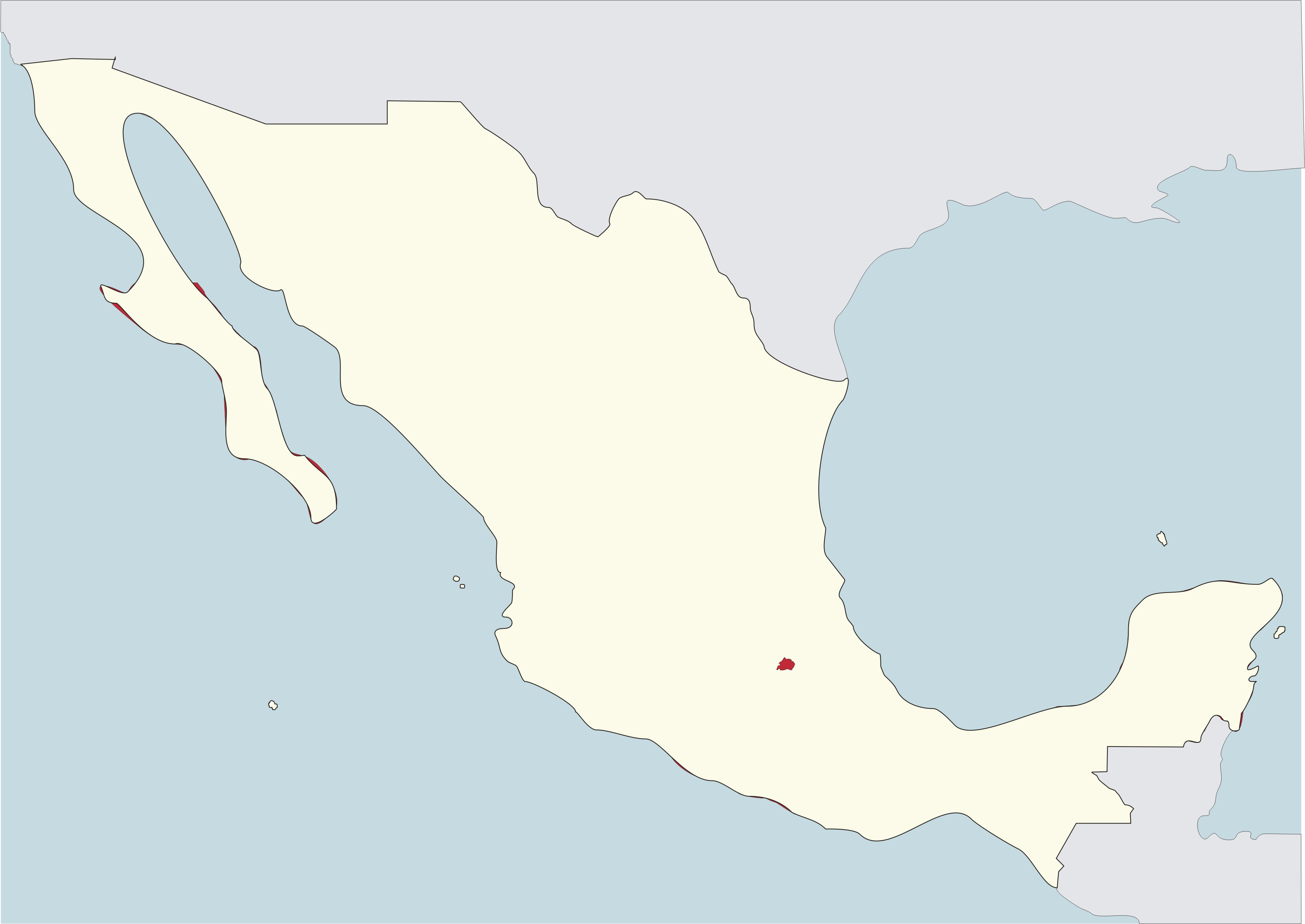

Website
- www.diocesisdeteotihuacan.org

The Roman Catholic Diocese of Teotihuacan (Latin: Dioecesis Teotihuacana) (erected 3 December 2008) is a suffragan diocese of the Archdiocese of Tlalnepantla.

== Ordinaries ==
- Guillermo Francisco Escobar Galicia (2008–Present)

== External links and references ==
- "Diocese of Teotihuacan". Catholic-Hierarchy.
