= José de Jesús Castillo Rentería =

Mexican Roman Catholic bishop

José de Jesús Castillo Rentería MNM
- Bishop of Tuxtepec
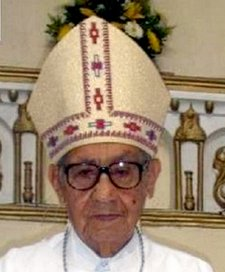
- Church: Catholic Church
- Diocese: Diocese of Tuxtepec
- In office: 8 January 1979 – 11 February 2005
- Predecessor: Diocese erected
- Successor: José Antonio Fernández Hurtado

Orders
- Ordination: 11 June 1950
- Consecration: 22 April 1979 by Girolamo Prigione

Personal details
- Born: 2 July 1927 Mexico City, Mexico
- Died: 23 April 2013 (aged 85)

José de Jesús Castillo Rentería, MNM (2 July 1927 – 23 April 2013) was the Catholic bishop of the Diocese of Tuxtepec, Mexico.

Ordained to the priesthood in 1950, he was named bishop of this diocese in 1979, retiring in 2005.
