= Texcoco Cathedral =

Coordinates: 19.5135°N 98.8838°W

Immaculate Conception Cathedral
- Catedral de la Inmaculada Concepción
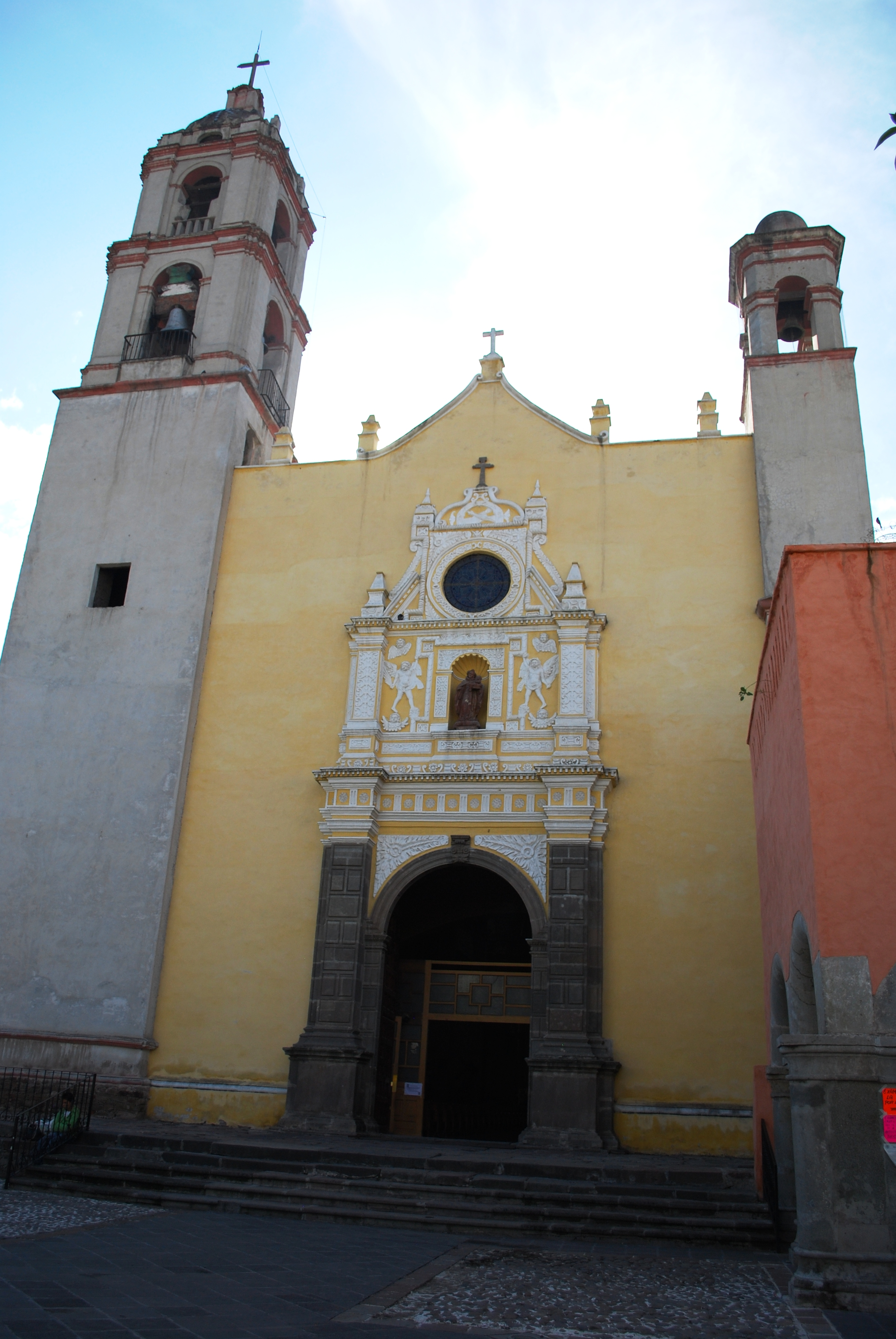
- Immaculate Conception Cathedral
- Location: Texcoco
- Country: Mexico
- Denomination: Roman Catholic Church

Administration
- Diocese: Roman Catholic Diocese of Texcoco

Clergy
- Bishop: Juan Manuel Mancilla Sánchez

The Immaculate Conception Cathedral (Spanish: Catedral de la Inmaculada Concepción) Also Texcoco Cathedral is a Catholic cathedral that is located in the former convent that the Franciscans built in the 16th century in the town of Texcoco in Mexico. This is one of the first complex convents that the Franciscan order built on lands of the new world, to carry out the process of evangelization.

The Franciscan friars, with Pedro de Gante, erected the first monastery in the area, for the year 1526, with the help of the native labor of the area. The major church was not built until 40 years later, around 1576.

Like all the conventual assemblages that were built in the sixteenth century, it had a fortified aspect, which still preserves the high walls of the cathedral. This was changed during the works carried out towards the 17th century, when it was given its present appearance (1690-1700).

It was made a cathedral in 1961, and Francisco Ferreira y Arreola was the first bishop.

== See also ==
- Roman Catholicism in Mexico
- Immaculate Conception Cathedral

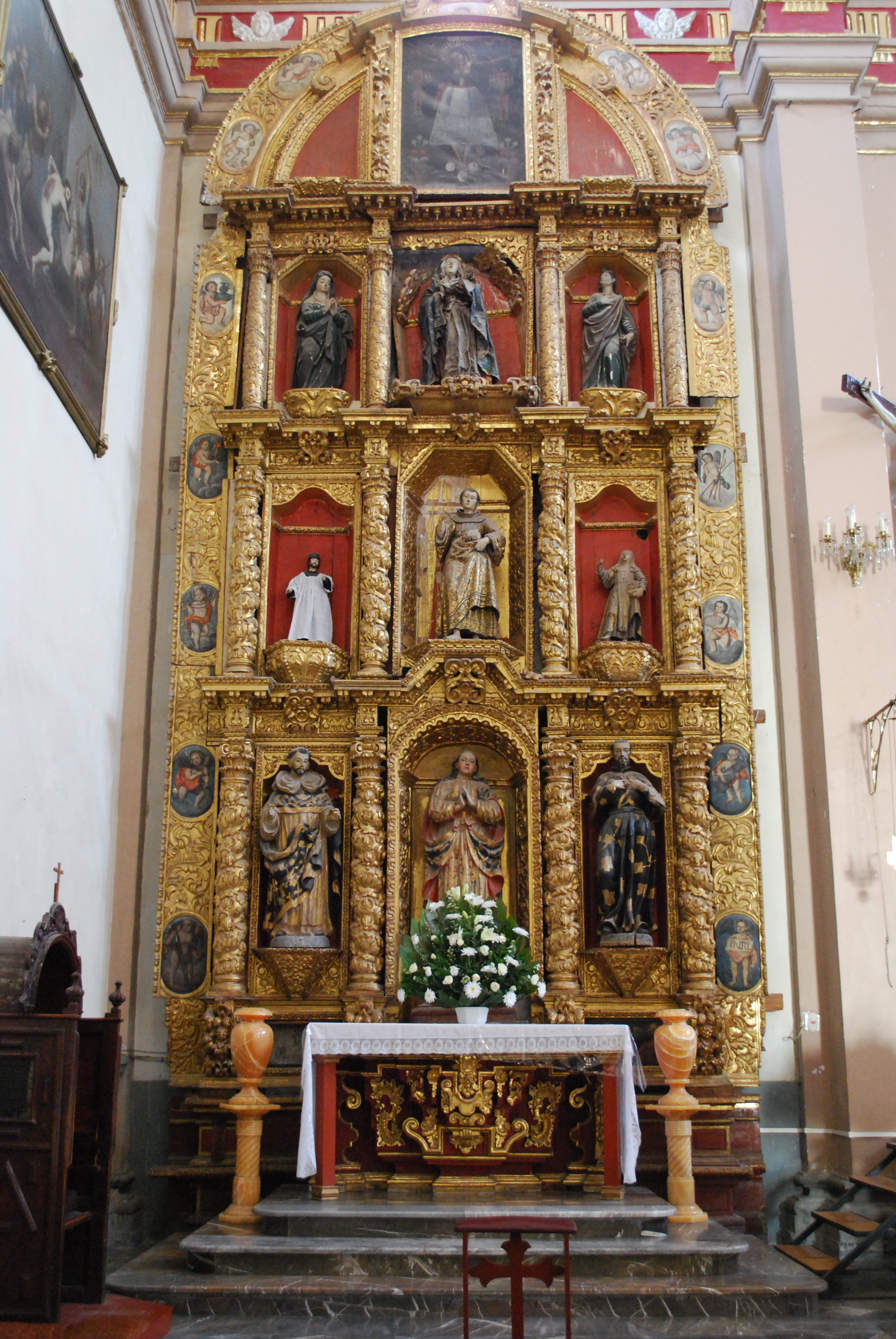
Internal View
