= Carlos Aguiar Retes =

Mexican Catholic cardinal (born 1950)

His Eminence Carlos Aguiar Retes
- Cardinal, Archbishop of Mexico City and Primate of Mexico
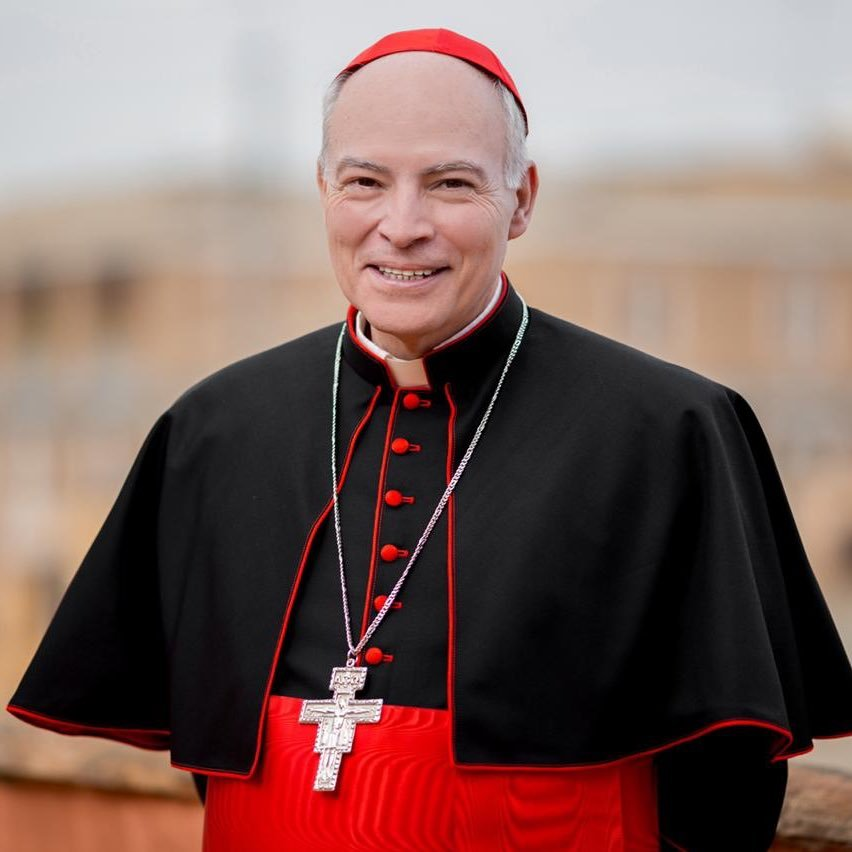
- Cardinal Aguiar in 2020
- Church: Catholic Church
- Archdiocese: Mexico City
- See: Mexico City
- Appointed: 7 December 2017
- Installed: 5 February 2018
- Predecessor: Norberto Rivera Carrera
- Other post: Cardinal-Priest of Santi Fabriano e Venanzio a Villa Fiorelli (since 2016)
- Previous posts: Bishop of Texcoco (1997–2009); Secretary General of the Latin American Episcopal Council (2000–03); First Vice-President of the Latin American Episcopal Council (2003–07); President of the Mexican Episcopal Conference (2006–12); President of the Latin American Episcopal Council (2011–15); Archbishop of Tlalnepantla (2009–17)

Orders
- Ordination: 22 April 1973
- Consecration: 29 June 1997 by Adolfo Antonio Suárez Rivera
- Created cardinal: 19 November 2016 by Pope Francis
- Rank: Cardinal-Priest

Personal details
- Born: Carlos Aguiar Retes; 9 January 1950 (age 76) Tepic, Mexico
- Education: Pontifical Latin American College; Pontifical Biblical Institute; Pontifical Gregorian University
- Motto: Que todos sean uno (May all be one)

- Coat of arms

Styles of Carlos Aguiar Retes
- Reference style: His Eminence
- Spoken style: Your Eminence
- Religious style: Cardinal
- Informal style: Cardinal

Ordination history of Carlos Aguiar Retes
History
Priestly ordination
- Date: 22 April 1973
Episcopal consecration
- Principal consecrator: Adolfo Antonio Suarez Rivera
- Co-consecrators: Magín Camerino Torreblanca Reyes; Alfonso Humberto Robles Cota
- Date: 29 June 1997
Cardinalate
- Elevated by: Pope Francis
- Date: 19 November 2016
Episcopal succession
Bishops consecrated by Carlos Aguiar Retes as principal consecrator
- Luis Artemio Flores Calzada: 8 September 2003
- Víctor René Rodríguez Gomez: 25 July 2006
- Guillermo Francisco Escobar Galicia: 24 February 2009
- Efraín Mendoza Cruz: 29 July 2011
- Jorge Cuapio Bautista: 27 May 2016

Carlos Aguiar Retes (Spanish pronunciation: [ˈkaɾlos aˈɣjaɾ ˈretes]; born 9 January 1950) is a Mexican cardinal of the Catholic Church who serves as the Archbishop of Mexico City. He has served as an officer of the Mexican Episcopal Conference and the Latin American Episcopal Conference (CELAM) and been president of both. He helped draft the landmark mission statement CELAM issued at the close of its 2007 conference in Aparecida. He was archbishop of Tlalnepantla from 2009 to 2017 and Bishop of Texcoco from 1997 to 2009. David Agren of the Catholic News Service calls him a "longtime ally" of Pope Francis who combines "intellectual finesse with a pastoral passion".

== Biography ==
Aguiar Retes was born on 9 January 1950, in Tepic, Mexico, the second of six children. His parents were Carlos Aguiar Manjarrez and María Teresa Retes Pérez-Sandi. He studied Humanities and Philosophy at the Seminary of Tepic, graduating in 1969, and theology at the Pontifical Seminary of Montezuma in Montezuma, New Mexico, in the United States through 1972, and at the Seminary of Tula, Hidalgo, finishing in 1973.

=== Priesthood ===
He was ordained a deacon on 24 December 1971. He was ordained a priest on 23 April 1973 in the Cathedral of Tepic. That year he began working as parochial vicar in the Parish of St. Maria Goretti, where he remained until 1974. He studied in Rome at the Pontifical Latin American College from 1974 to 1977, where he earned a degree in Holy Scripture from the Pontifical Biblical Institute. He returned to Mexico and was appointed rector of the Seminary of Tepic.

In 1991 he returned to Rome to continue his studies. From 1992 to 1993 he was part of a team of biblical scholars who prepared the edition of la Biblia de América, a translation of the Bible into accessible language. In 1996 he completed a doctorate in biblical theology at the Pontifical Gregorian University, with a thesis "Criticism of the prophets fasting". Between 1996 and 1997 he held the chair of Sacred Scripture at the Pontifical University of Mexico, where he was also rector of the John XXIII Residence for Priests.

In addition to Spanish, Aguiar is fluent in Italian, English, French and German.

=== Bishop and archbishop ===
On 28 May 1997 Pope John Paul II appointed him the third bishop of Texcoco. He was ordained a bishop on 29 June. He was named a member of the Pontifical Council for Interreligious Dialogue on 8 March 2007.

In May 2003, he was elected to a four-year term as Vice President of the Latin American Bishops' Conference (CELAM). In preparation for that year's conference held in Aparecida, Brazil, he authored a paper on globalization and the new evangelization that linked the devaluation of local cultures and traditional community-sanctioned norms to the economic forces behind mass migration and environmental damage. At the conference, he served on the drafting committee headed by Cardinal Jorge Bergoglio (later Pope Francis) that produced a conference statement that endorsed key elements of liberation theology recast as less overtly political and integrated into the Church's mission.

In 2008 he discussed the relationship between the Mexican bishops and drug traffickers who at times funded the construction of local churches. After several other bishops denied the Church accepted donations of funds from illegal activities, Aguiar said the drug lords "are generous and often they provide money for building a church or chapel" and "install electricity, establish communication links, highways [and] roads" in poor communities. He said that some criminals hope to ease their consciences through good works and seek reassurances from the clergy: "There has been a rapprochement with them as it's known that discretion is going to be kept. What they want is to encounter peace in their consciences. What they're going to get from us is a sharp response: Change your life."

On 5 February 2009, Pope Benedict XVI named him Archbishop of Tlalnepantla. He was installed on 31 March. One analyst of church appointments noted that this was a less prestigious appointment than his career path indicated, suggesting Pope Benedict had expressed some disfavor in failing to appoint him to the archdioceses of Guadalajara in 2011 and Monterrey in 2012.

In May 2011, when he was head of the Mexican Episcopal Conference, he was elected to a four-year term as President of the Latin American Bishops' Conference (CELAM). He previously served as the organization's secretary-general and vice president. He presented an interviewer with his assessment of the Latin American church as "the transition from a time when Christian values were accepted by everyone to a situation where the models are changing, and a multi-cultural society is forming". He said:

We can't take the view that our primary task is to stand on the threshold checking whether or not people have the administrative requirements for belonging to the Church. This is the moment to proclaim the essentials of Christianity, to everybody. To people as they are, in the concrete circumstances in which they live now, with the expectations that they now have. In the area of Mexico where I live, there are twelve dioceses where people live who come and go each day because of their vital needs. That’s the point, we must take on board all the new conditions of coexistence. For example, making access to the sacraments easier, so that the demands of the parish do not become a reason to lose all contact with the Church.

He said that ideological descriptions of church activity were outdated, that most of the Church leadership recognized the need to promote government policies rather than align themselves with a particular government, and that humility about the Church's failings would render media attempts to "denigrate the ecclesiastical institution" harmless. He nevertheless worked in concert with local government officials, including Enrique Peña Nieto, the Governor of the state of Mexico who later became President of Mexico. The state government helped fund some religious instruction. In 2009 Aguiar helped negotiate an enhanced constitutional recognition of religious liberty. He worked with Governor Eruviel Ávila and representatives of other religions on a statement of shared values, the "Pact for the Strengthening of Values with Religious Associations" ("Pacto por el Fortalecimiento de los Valores con Asociaciones Religiosas"), to coordinate efforts to strengthen social institutions.

On 18 September 2012, Pope Benedict named Aguiar to participate in the October 2012 Synod of Bishops on the New Evangelization. He served as moderator of one of the Spanish language groups. Addressing the Synod he said that "the institutional organization of the Church is necessary, it is not sufficient. To achieve New Evangelization and to transmit the faith to the new generations, the Church must be considered with complete honesty, through a self-examination on the way of living the faith. The proposal of a new style of life applies not only to the Pastors, but to all Christians living in America." Along with his Latin American colleagues, he stressed that "Religiosity remains alive and is the great potential reserve of our peoples", that "deep popular piety rooted in all the countries" of the region. He said that "We cannot forget the simple prayer of the masses who, at shrines and in folk festivals, express their own devotion and unfortunately feel unwelcomed and unaccompanied" and said that the Church needs to develop this piety as pastors and encourage it to develop "a commitment to social transformation which contributes to the well-being of the most needy". He called for a renewed emphasis on communities of faith rather than institutional structures. He had mentioned similar themes in anticipation of Benedict's visit to Mexico earlier in the year.

In Tlalnepantla, Aguiar developed a program that had lay Catholics invite neighbors to join in parish activities. In promoting the Church's position on government policies, he asked the laity to lead the effort, for example in opposing a plan to establish a right to same-sex marriage in the constitution. He emphasized a variety of social service ministries including local psychological counseling centers, services for single mothers, and religious instruction for prisoners and their families. The diocese promoted a youth festival that featured sports like biker acrobatics, a graffiti contest, a car tuning demonstration, and popular music concerts from boombox to classic rock. In religious education he stressed experience and assimilating Catholic doctrine into daily life over memorization and recitation.

In April 2013, as President of CELAM along with its other officers he met with Pope Francis shortly after his election. He reported they discussed the ongoing implementation of Aparecida and he said that "Pope Francis is the one — if not the one who most – certainly expresses in his attitudes and words the theological-pastoral development of Aparecida".

He was again a Synod Father appointed by Pope Francis in 2014 and 2015 sessions of the Synod on the Family. At the end of the 2014 session, he participated in drafting the relatio that summarized the bishops' discussions.

Aguiar is the Grand Prior of the Mexico Lieutenancy of the Equestrian Order of the Holy Sepulchre of Jerusalem.

=== Cardinal ===
On 9 October 2016, Pope Francis announced that he was one of the 17 new cardinals to be created on 19 November 2016. He was made Cardinal Priest of Santi Fabiano e Venanzio a Villa Fiorelli. He was the sixth Mexican to become a cardinal and the first archbishop of Tlalnepantla to receive the title. Pope Francis, a longtime friend, named him a cardinal while not doing the same for the archbishop of Monterey, traditionally a cardinal's see.

He was named a member of the Pontifical Commission for Latin America in January 2017.

On 7 December 2017, Pope Francis named him Archbishop of Mexico to succeed Norberto Rivera Carrera who spent 22 years in the post. His installation was held on 5 February 2018. The Tablet said the appointment was not a surprise because Aguiar is "a towering ecclesial figure in Central and Latin America".

In December 2020, Aguiar supported the establishment of civil unions for same-sex couples. He said that "everyone has the right to family". He called on parents to remain close to their children who declare themselves gay or lesbian, adding "If they decide as a matter of free choice to be with another person, to be in a union, that's freedom".

Aguiar participated as a cardinal elector in the 2025 papal conclave that elected Pope Leo XIV.

== See also ==
- Catholic Church in Mexico
- History of the Catholic Church in Mexico

Catholic Church titles
Preceded by Margin Camerino Torreblanca Reyes	Bishop of Texcoco; 28 May 1997 – 5 February 2009	Succeeded by Juan Manuel Mancilla Sanchez
Preceded by Felipe Arizmendi Esquivel	General Secretary of the Latin American Episcopal Council; 2000 – 2003	Succeeded by Ramón Benito de La Rosa y Carpio
Preceded by Francisco Javier Errázuriz Ossa	First Vice-President of the Latin American Episcopal Council; 2003 – 12 December 2007	Succeeded by Baltazar Enrique Porras Cardozo
Preceded by José Guadalupe Martín Rábago	President of the Mexican Episcopal Conference; 2006 – 14 November 2012	Succeeded by José Francisco Robles Ortega
Preceded by Ricardo Guízar Diaz	Archbishop of Tlalnepantla; 5 February 2009 – 7 December 2017	Succeeded by Jose Antonio Fernández Hurtado
Preceded by Raymundo Damasceno Assis	President of the Latin American Episcopal Council; 19 May 2011 – 13 May 2015	Succeeded by Rubén Salazar Gómez
Preceded by Ján Chryzostom Korec	Cardinal-Priest of Santi Fabiano e Venanzio a Villa Fiorelli; 19 November 2016 –	Incumbent
Preceded by Norberto Rivera Carrera	Archbishop of Mexico; 7 December 2017 –	Incumbent
