= Diocese of Tuxtepec =

Latin Catholic jurisdiction in Mexico

Diocese of Tuxtepec Dioecesis Tuxtepecensis
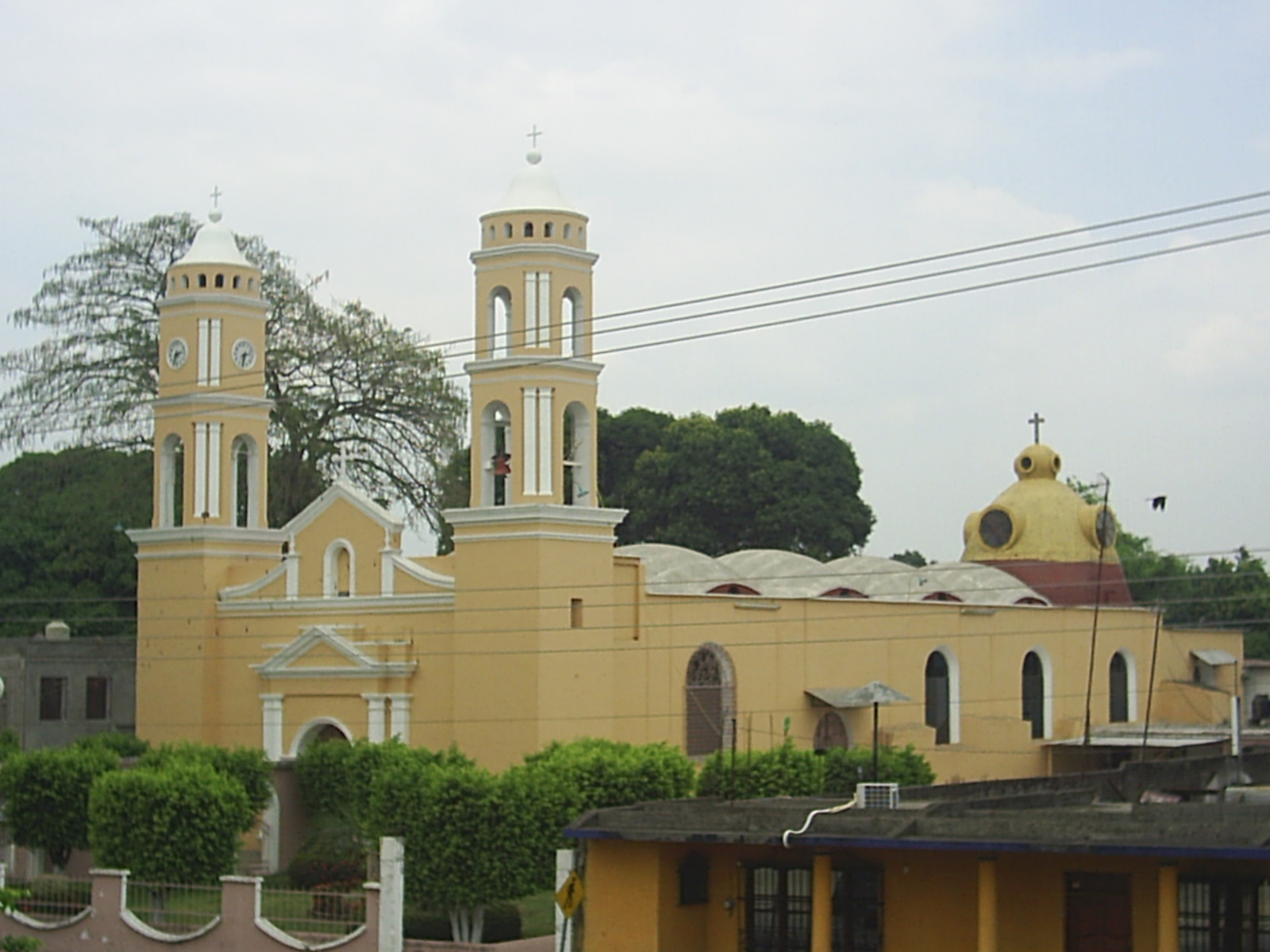
- Former Tuxtepec Cathedral

Location
- Country: Mexico
- Ecclesiastical province: Archdiocese of Antequera, Oaxaca
- Coordinates: 18°04′53″N 96°07′03″W
- Population: 660,000

Information
- Denomination: Catholic Church
- Sui iuris church: Latin Church
- Rite: Roman Rite
- Established: January 8, 1979

Current leadership
- Pope: Leo XIV
- Metropolitan Archbishop: Pedro Vázquez Villalobos
- Apostolic Administrator: Guadalupe Antonio Ruíz Urquín

Map
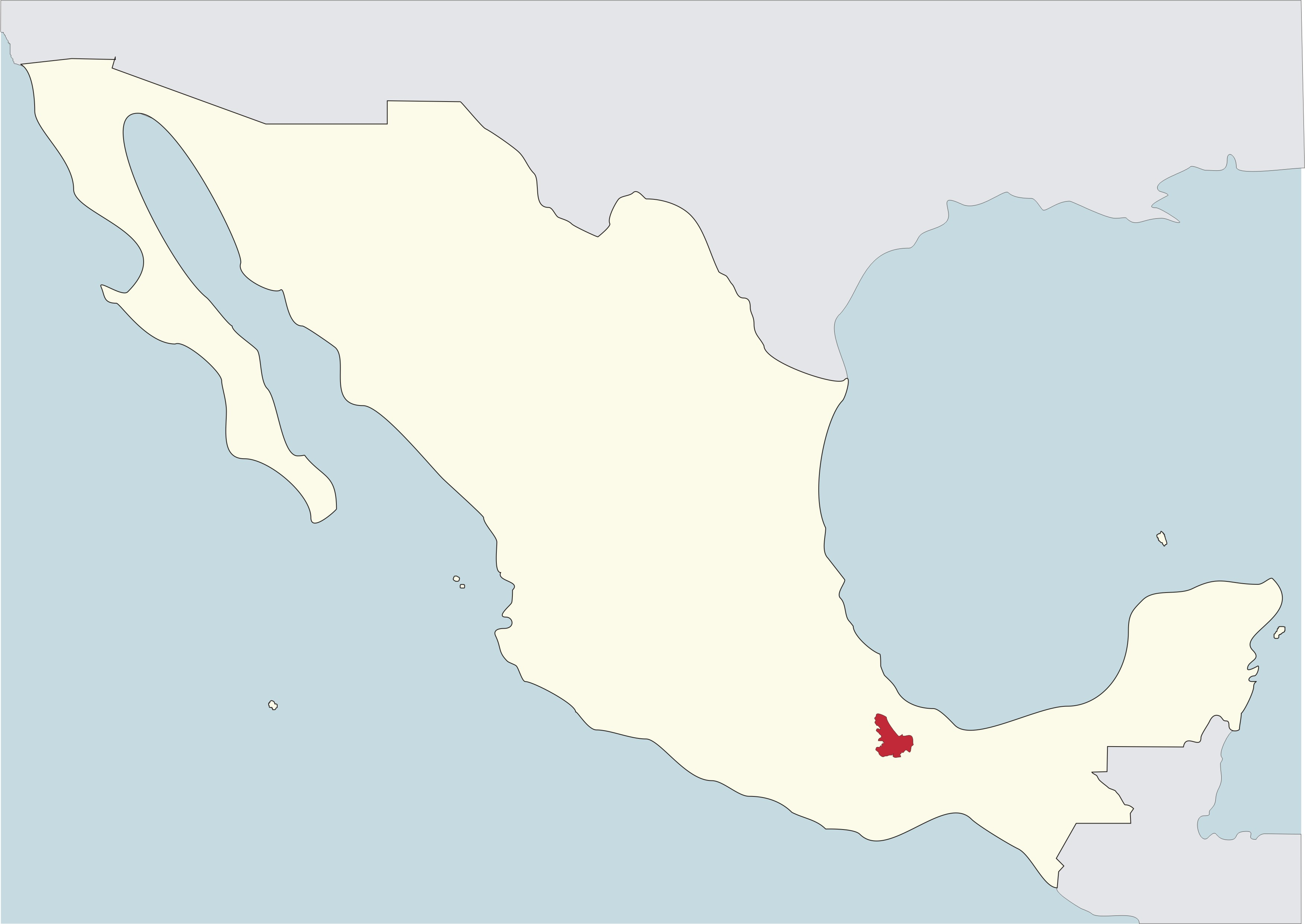

The Diocese of Tuxtepec (Latin: Dioecesis Tuxtepecensis) is a Latin Church ecclesiastical territory or diocese of the Catholic Church in Mexico. It is a suffragan in the ecclesiastical province of the metropolitan Archdiocese of Antequera. The diocese's episcopal see is San Juan Bautista Tuxtepec.

== Ordinaries ==
Bishops of Tuxtepec (Roman Rite)

- José de Jesús Castillo Rentería, M.N.M. (1979 – 2005), retired
- José Antonio Fernández Hurtado (2005 – 2014), appointed Archbishop of Durango
- José Alberto González Juárez (2015 – 2026), appointed Bishop of Campeche
  - Apostolic administrator Guadalupe Antonio Ruíz Urquín (2026 – Present), Prelate of Huautla

== External links and references ==
- "Diocese of Tuxtepec". Catholic-Hierarchy.
