= Diocese of Izcalli =

Roman Catholic diocese in Mexico

Coordinates: 19.6458°N 99.2140°W

Location
- Country: Mexico
- Ecclesiastical province: Tlalnepantla

Statistics
- Area: 533 km^{2} (206 sq mi)
- Population: (as of 2014); 821,351
- Parishes: 33

Information
- Denomination: Catholic Church
- Rite: Roman Rite
- Established: 9 June 2014 (11 years ago)
- Cathedral: Catedral Santa María de la Anunciación

Current leadership
- Pope: Leo XIV
- Bishop: Francisco González Ramos

The Roman Catholic Diocese of Izcalli is based in the city of Cuautitlán Izcalli, State of Mexico, Mexico. It is a suffragan see to the Archdiocese of Tlalnepantla.

== History ==
On 9 June 2014 Pope Francis established the diocese from territory taken from the Diocese of Cuautitlán.

== Ordinaries ==
- Francisco González Ramos (2014-)
