= Archdiocese of Tlalnepantla =

Roman Catholic archdiocese in Mexico

Coordinates: 19.5379°N 99.1946°W

Archdiocese of Tlalnepantla Archidioecesis Tlanepantlanus Arquidiócesis de Tlalnepantla
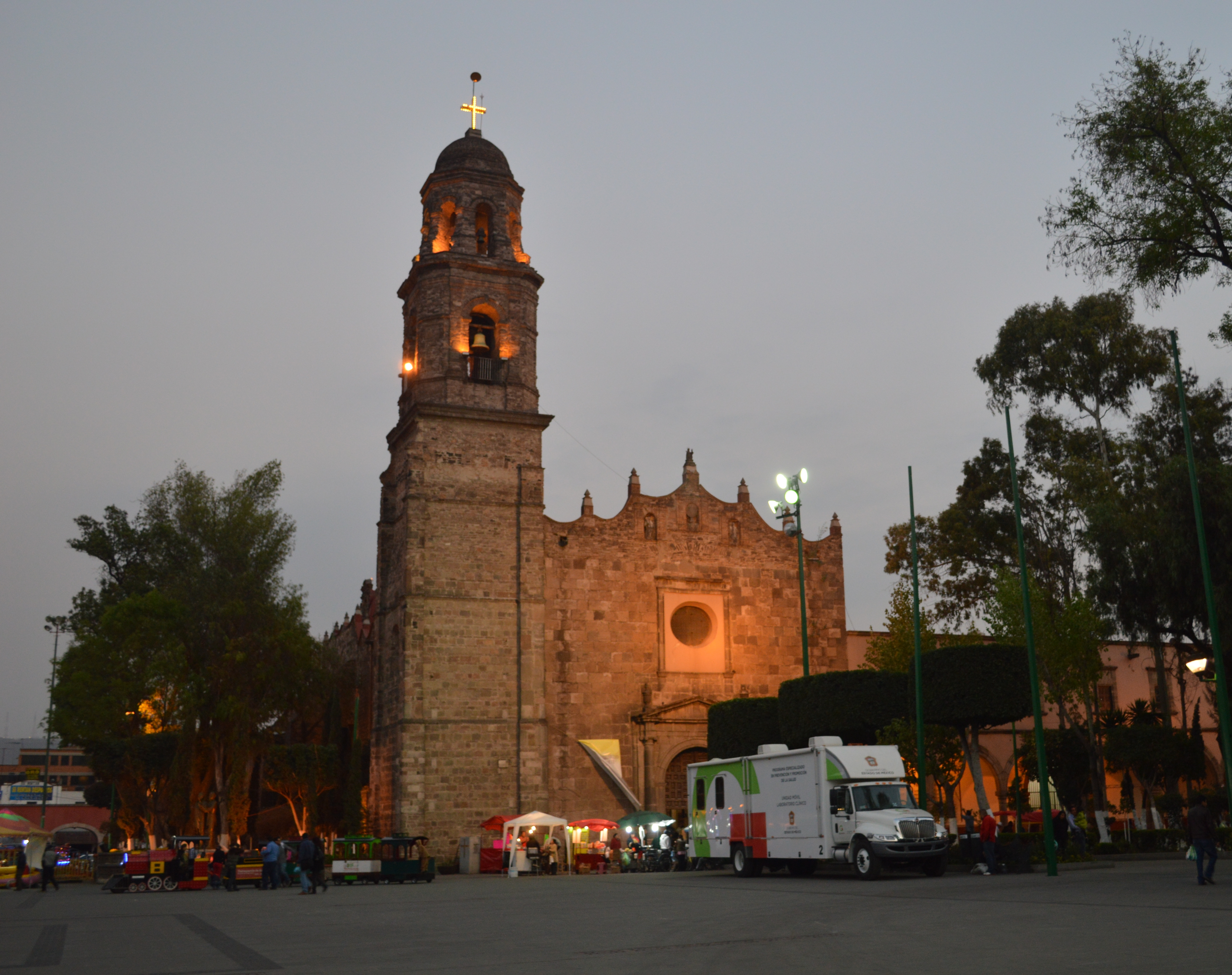
- Corpus Christi Cathedral

Location
- Country: Mexico
- Ecclesiastical province: Tlalnepantla

Statistics
- Area: 263 sq mi (680 km^{2})
- Population: Total; Catholics: (as of 2010); 3,980,000; 3,184,000 (80%)
- Parishes: 200

Information
- Denomination: Catholic Church
- Rite: Roman Rite
- Established: 13 January 1964 (62 years ago)
- Cathedral: Catedral de Corpus Christi

Current leadership
- Pope: Leo XIV
- Archbishop: José Antonio Fernández Hurtado
- Auxiliary Bishops: Efraín Mendoza Cruz; Jorge Cuapio Bautista
- Bishops emeritus: Francisco Ramírez Navarro

Map

The Roman Catholic Archdiocese of Tlalnepantla (Latin: Archidioecesis Tlanepantlanus) is a Metropolitan Archdiocese in Mexico. Based in Tlalnepantla, México state, its suffragan dioceses include Cuautitlán, Ecatepec, Izcalli, Netzahualcóyotl, Teotihuacan, Texcoco, and Valle de Chalco.

== Bishops ==
=== Ordinaries ===
- Felipe de Jesús Cueto González, O.F.M. (1964–1979)
- Adolfo Antonio Suárez Rivera (1980–1983), appointed Archbishop of Monterrey, Nuevo León (Cardinal in 1994)
- Manuel Pérez-Gil y González (1984–1996)
- Ricardo Guízar Díaz (1996–2009)
- Carlos Aguiar Retes (2009–2017), elevated to Cardinal in 2016; appointed Archbishop of México, Federal District
- José Antonio Fernández Hurtado (2019–

=== Auxiliary bishops ===
- Francisco Ramírez Navarro (2000–2015)
- Efraín Mendoza Cruz (2011–
- Jorge Cuapio Bautista (2015–

== See also ==
- List of Roman Catholic archdioceses in México

== External links and references ==
- "Archdiocese of Tlalnepantla". Catholic-Hierarchy.
