= Diocese of Netzahualcóyotl =

Roman Catholic diocese in Mexico

Diocese of Nezahualcóyotl Dioecesis Nezahualcoyotlensis Diócesis de Nezahualcóyotl

Location
- Country: Mexico
- Ecclesiastical province: Province of Tlalnepantla
- Metropolitan: Tlalnepantla

Statistics
- Area: 930 sq mi (2,400 km^{2})
- Population: Total; Catholics: (as of 2004); 5,647,243; 5,364,880 (95%)
- Parishes: 83

Information
- Denomination: Roman Catholic
- Rite: Roman Rite
- Established: 5 February 1979 (46 years ago)
- Cathedral: Cathedral of Jesus Lord of Mercy

Current leadership
- Pope: Leo XIV
- Bishop: Héctor Luis Morales Sánchez

Website
- www.diocesdenezahualcoyotl.org.mx

The Roman Catholic Diocese of Nezahualcóyotl (Latin: Dioecesis Netzahualcoyotlensis) (erected 5 February 1979) is a suffragan diocese of the Archdiocese of Tlalnepantla.

== Ordinaries ==
- José Melgoza Osorio (1979 - 1989)
- José María Hernández González (1989 - 2003)
- Carlos Garfias Merlos (2003 - 2010, appointed Archbishop of Acapulco)
- Héctor Luis Morales Sánchez (2011–present)

== Territorial losses ==
Year	Along with	To form
2003		Diocese of Valle de Chalco

== External links and references ==
- "Diocese of Netzahualcóyotl". Catholic-Hierarchy.
