= Diocese of Valle de Chalco =

Roman Catholic diocese in Mexico

Diocese of Valle de Chalco Dioecesis Vallis Chalcensis Diócesis de Valle de Chalco

Location
- Country: Mexico
- Ecclesiastical province: Province of Tlalnepantla
- Metropolitan: Tlalnepantla

Statistics
- Area: 477 sq mi (1,240 km^{2})
- Population: Total; Catholics: (as of 2010); 2,613,000; 2,302,000 (88.1%)
- Parishes: 56

Information
- Denomination: Roman Catholic
- Rite: Roman Rite
- Established: 8 July 2003 (22 years ago)
- Cathedral: Cathedral of St. Juan Diego

Current leadership
- Pope: Leo XIV
- Bishop: Víctor René Rodríguez Gómez

Map
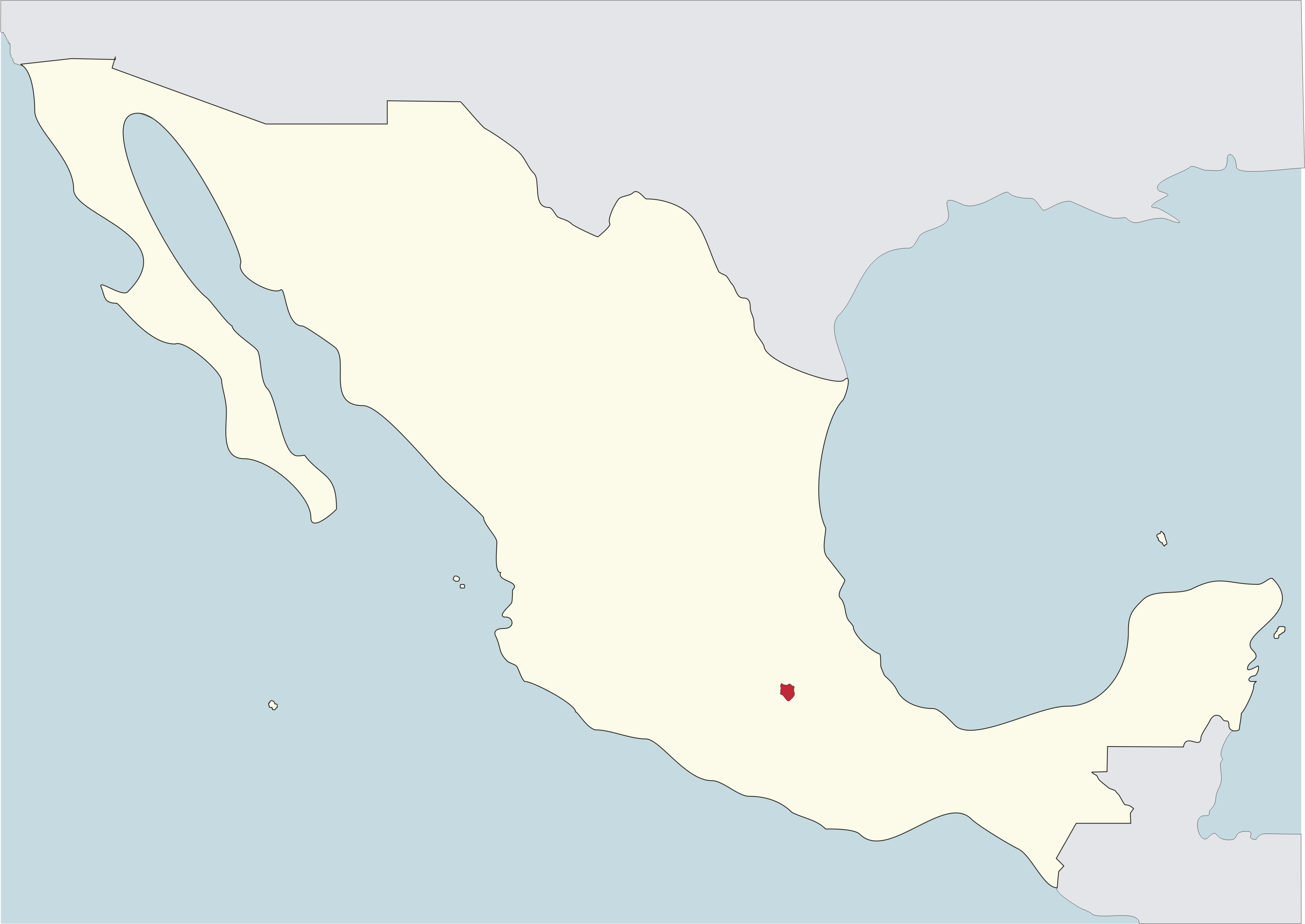

Website
- www.diocesisvalledechalco.org

The Roman Catholic Diocese of Valle de Chalco (Latin: Dioecesis Vallis Chalcensis) (erected 8 July 2003) is a suffragan diocese of the Archdiocese of Tlalnepantla.

== Ordinaries ==
- Luis Artemio Flores Calzada (2003–2012), appointed Bishop of Tepic, Nayarit
- Víctor René Rodríguez Gómez (2012 – Present)
