= Diocese of Ecatepec =

Roman Catholic diocese in Mexico

Coordinates: 19.5994°N 99.0463°W

Diocese of Ecatepec Dioecesis Ecatepecensis Diócesis de Ecatepec
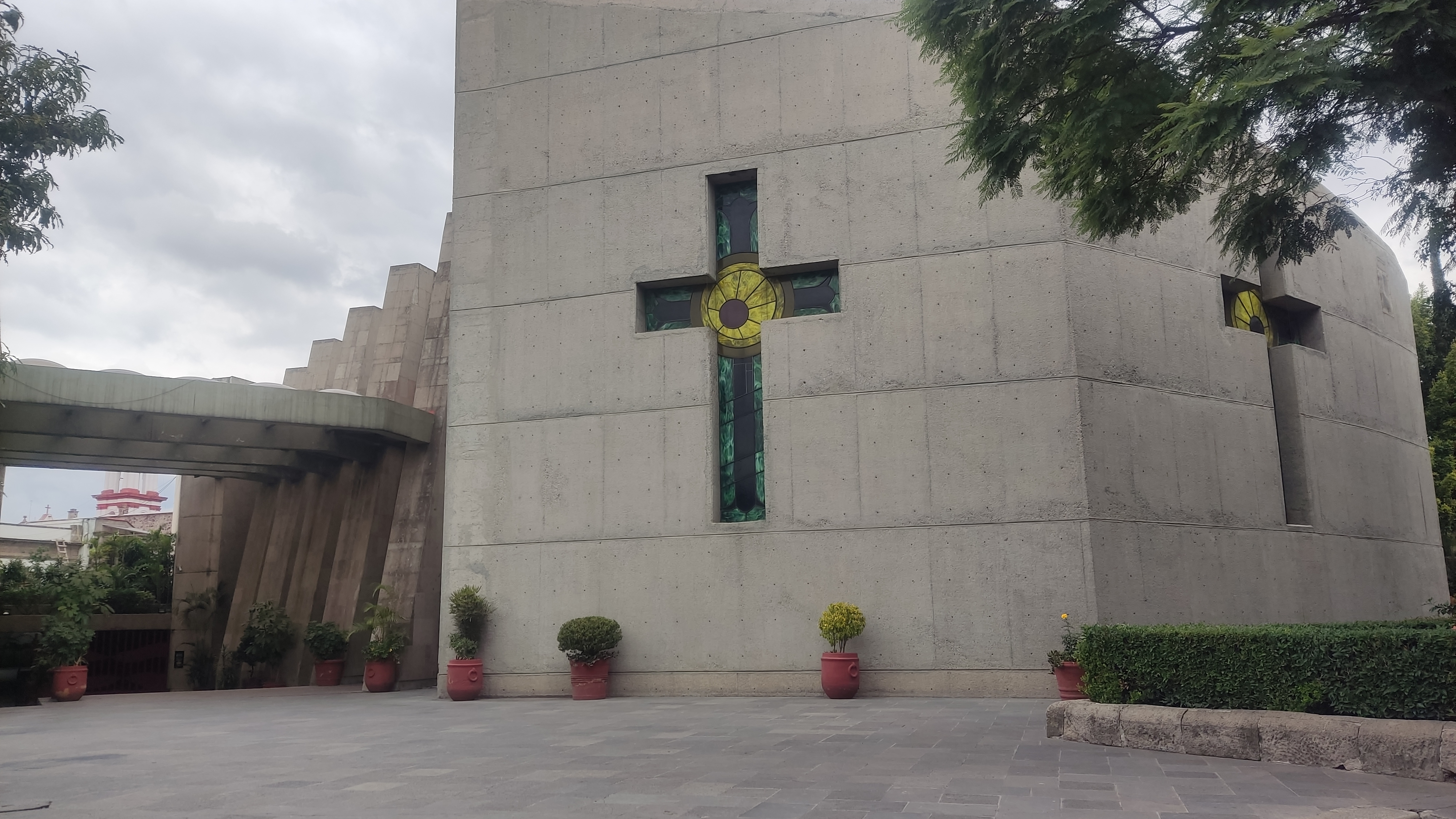
- Catedral dal Sagrado Corazón de Jesús

Location
- Country: Mexico
- Metropolitan: Archdiocese of Tlalnepantla
- Headquarters: Ecatepec de Morelos, State of Mexico, Mexico

Statistics
- Area: 204 km^{2} (79 sq mi)
- Population: Total; Catholics: (as of 2023); 1,643,283; 1,239,049 (75.4%)
- Parishes: 100

Information
- Denomination: Catholic Church
- Sui iuris church: Latin Church
- Rite: Roman Rite
- Established: 28 June 1995; 31 years ago
- Cathedral: Cathedral of the Sacred Heart of Jesus
- Patron saint: Saint Christopher; Sacred Heart
- Secular priests: 156 (143 Diocesan, 13 Religious Orders)

Current leadership
- Pope: Leo XIV
- Bishop: José Guadalupe Torres Campos
- Metropolitan Archbishop: José Antonio Fernández Hurtado

The Roman Catholic Diocese of Ecatepec (Latin: Dioecesis Ecatepecensis) (erected 28 June 1995) is a suffragan diocese of the Archdiocese of Tlalnepantla in Mexico. The see city is Ecatepec de Morelos in the state of Mexico.

== Leadership ==
=== Bishops of Ecatepec ===
- Onésimo Cepeda Silva (28 June 1995 – 7 May 2012)
- Oscar Roberto Domínguez Couttolenc, M.G. (17 July 2012 – 3 July 2024), appointed Archbishop of Tulancingo
- José Guadalupe Torres Campos (13 May 2026 – Present)
