= List of cathedrals in Mexico =

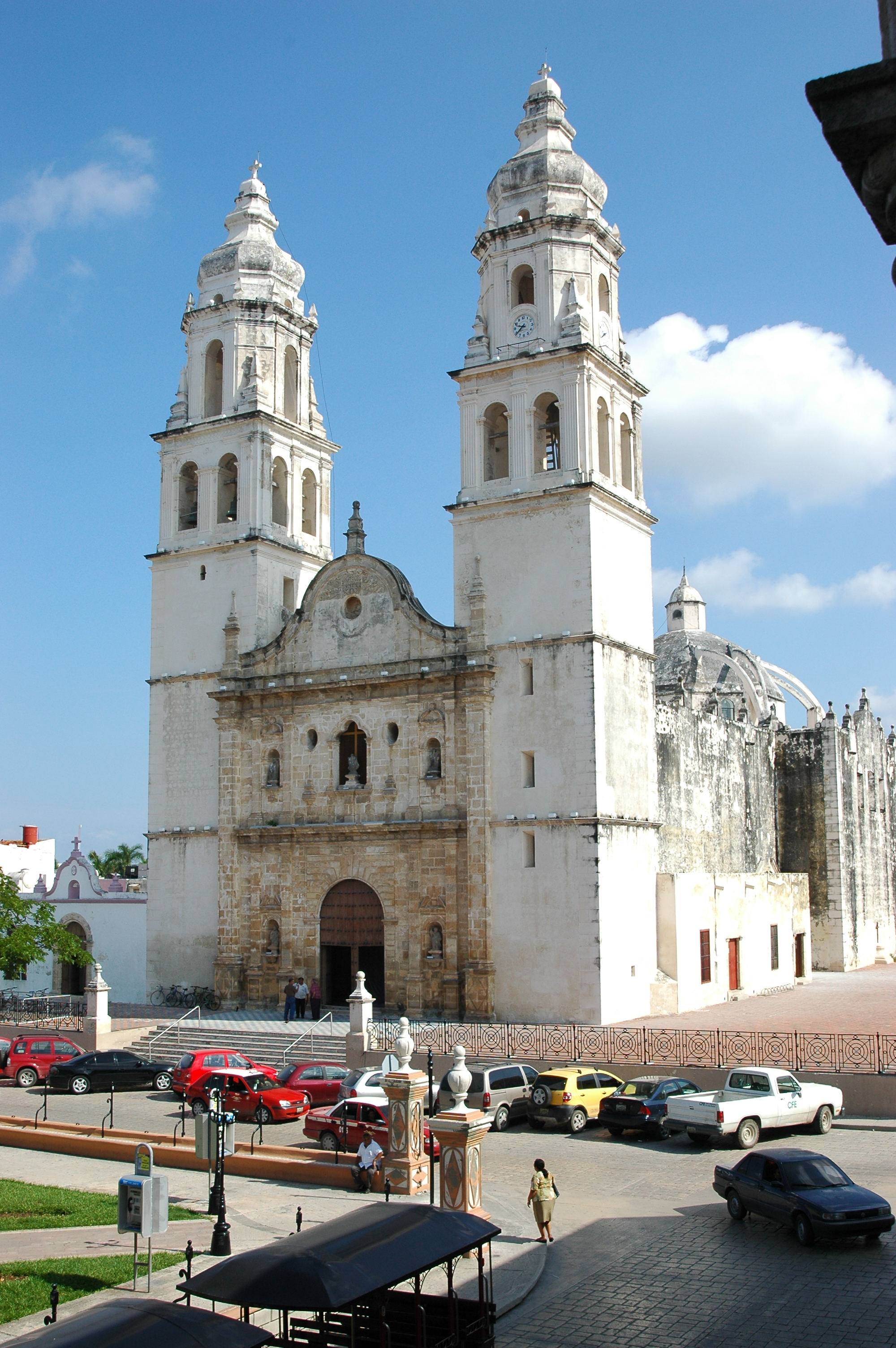
Cathedral of Our Lady of the Immaculate Conception in Campeche

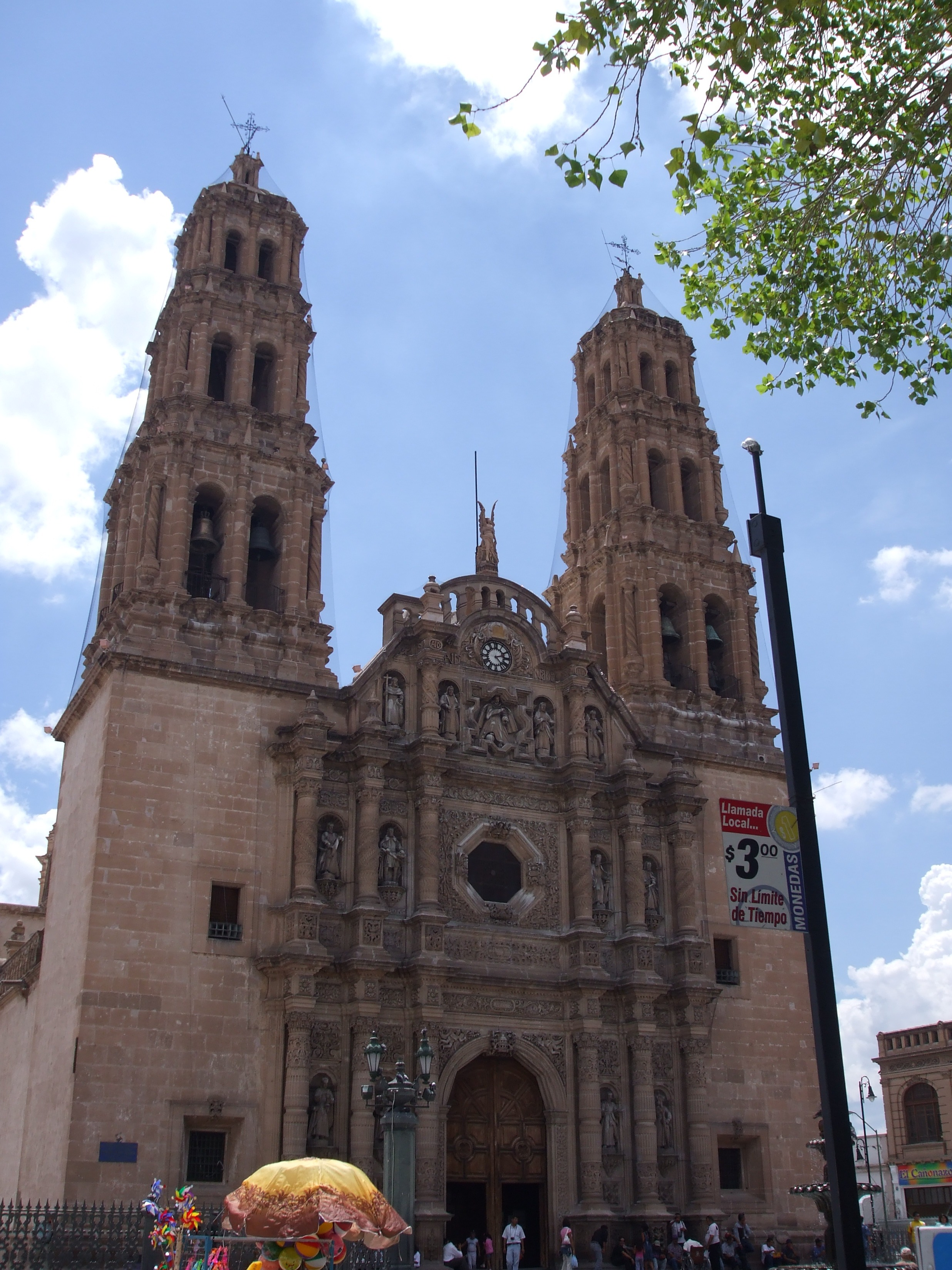
Metropolitan Cathedral of the Holy Cross, Our Lady of Regla and St. Francis of Assisi in Chihuahua

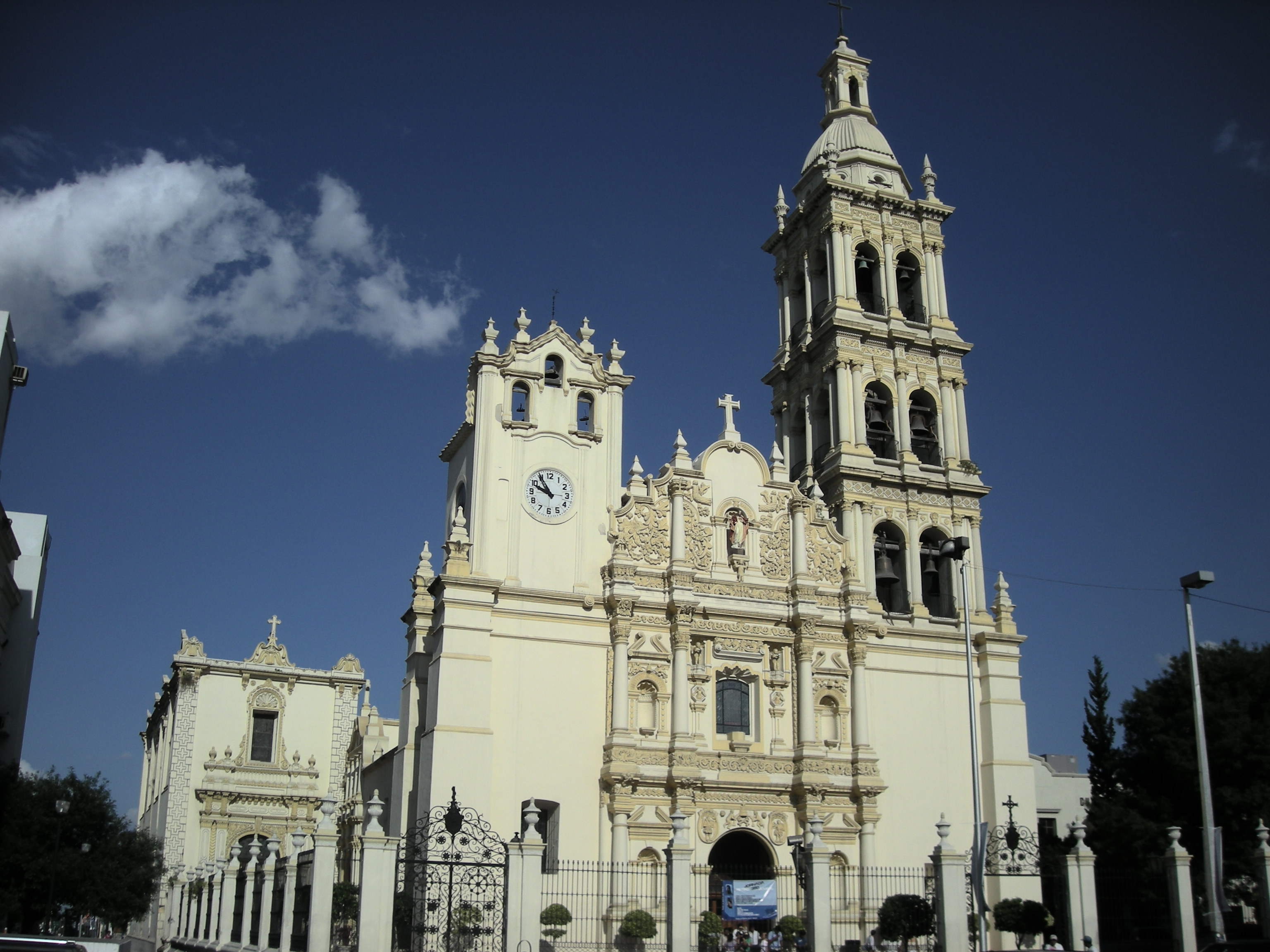
Cathedral of Our Lady of Monterrey in Monterrey

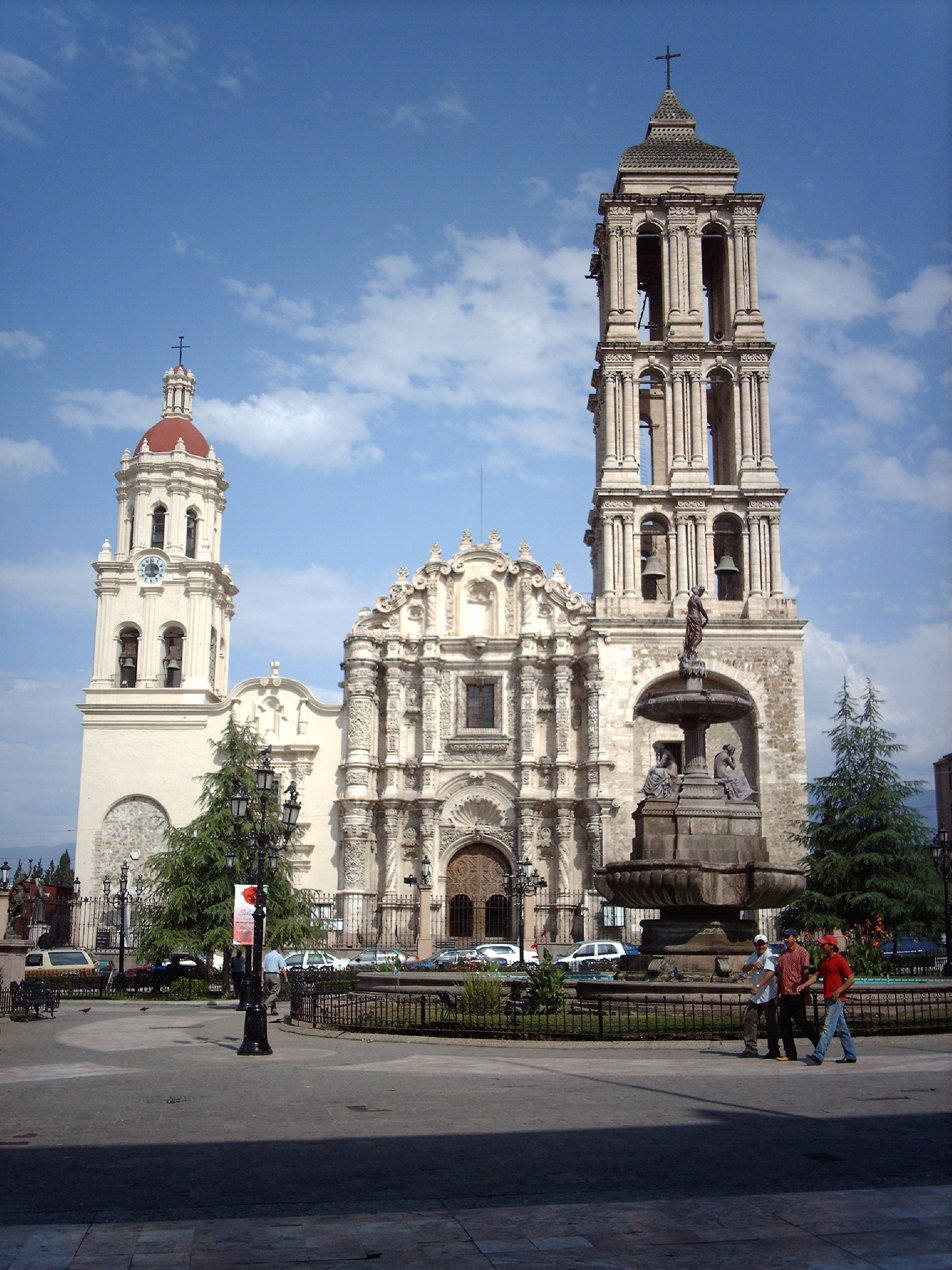
Cathedral of St. James in Saltillo

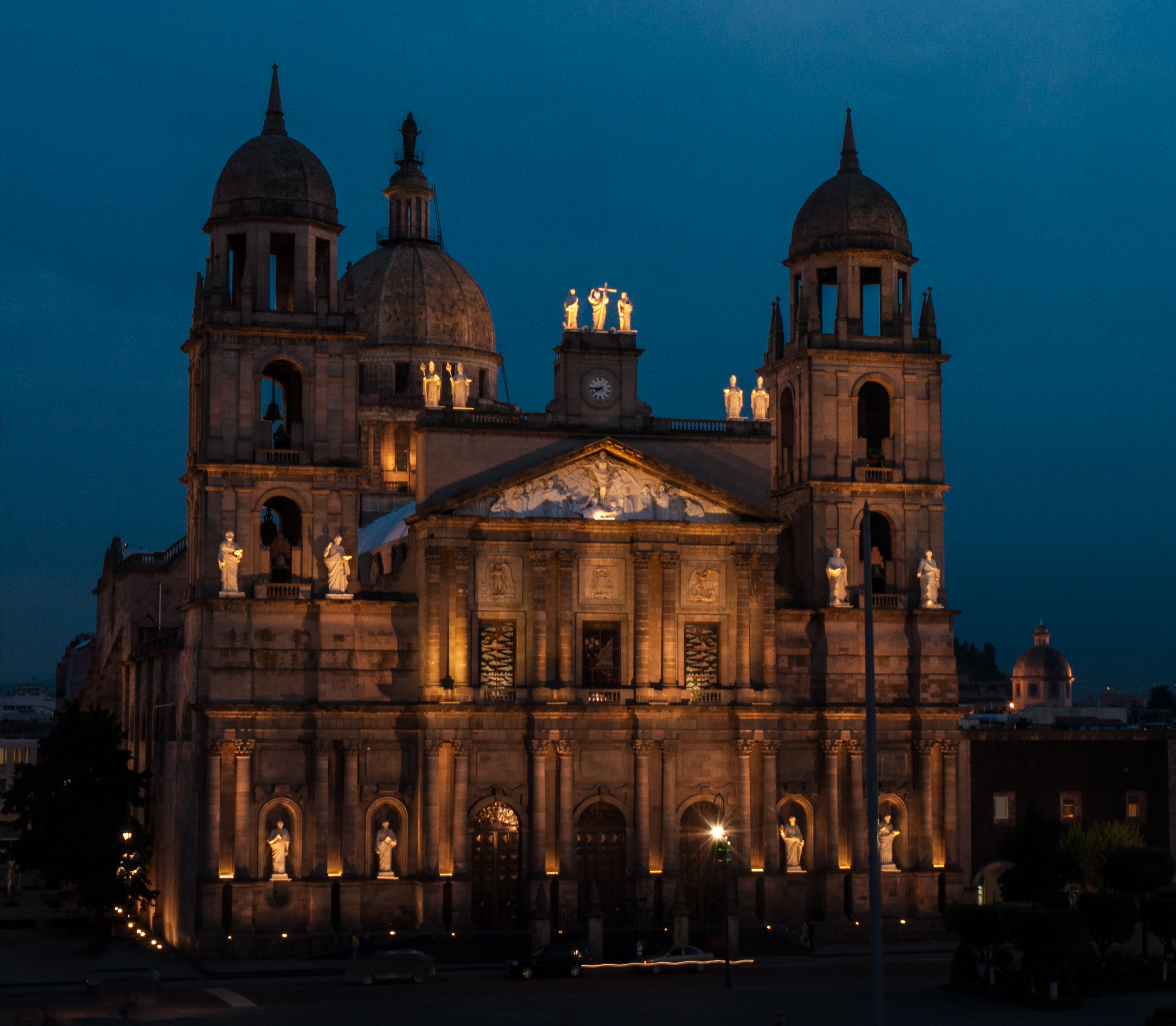
Cathedral of St. Joseph of Nazareth in Toluca

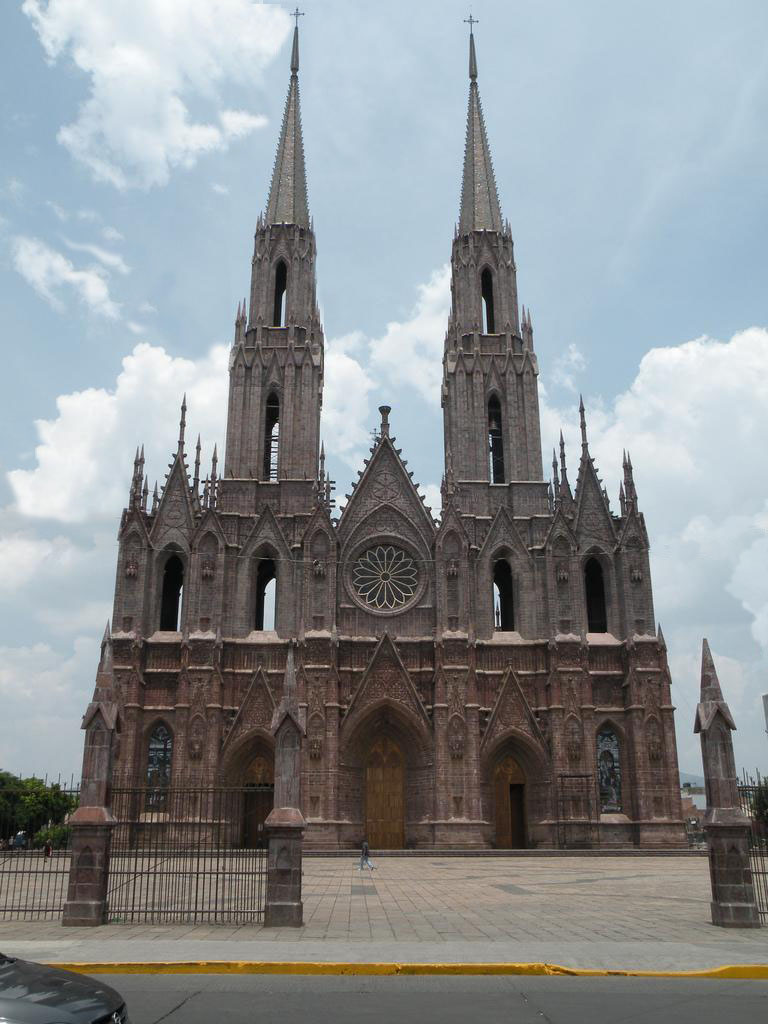
Cathedral of Our Lady of Guadalupe in Zamora

The following is a list of cathedrals in Mexico.

== Latin Catholic ==
Cathedrals of the Catholic Church in Mexico:

- Catedral Nuestra Señora de la Soledad in Acapulco
- Catedral Basílica de Nuestra Señora de la Asunción in Aguascalientes
- Cathedral of the Immaculate Conception in Apatzingan
- Catedral de la Divina Providencia in Atlacomulco
- Cathedral of the Holy Trinity in Autlán
- Cathedral of Our Lady of the Immaculate Conception in Campeche
- Cathedral of the Most Pure Conception in Celaya
- Cathedral of the Sacred Heart of Jesus in Chetumal
- Metropolitan Cathedral of the Holy Cross, Our Lady of Regla and St. Francis of Assisi in Chihuahua
- Co-Cathedral of the Assumption in Chilapa
- Cathedral of the Assumption in Chilpancingo
- Cathedral of St. John the Baptist in Ciudad Altamirano
- Cathedral of St. Joseph in Ciudad Guzmán
- Catedral de Nuestra Señora de Guadalupe in Ciudad Juárez
- Cathedral of Jesus Lord of Mercy in Ciudad Nezahualcóyotl
- Cathedral of the Sacred Heart of Jesus in Ciudad Obregón
- Catedral de Nuestra Señora de Guadalupe in Ciudad Valles
- Cathedral of the Sacred Heart of Jesus in Ciudad Victoria
- Cathedral of St. Joseph in Coatzacoalcos
- Cathedral Basilica of Our Lady of Guadalupe in Colima
- Cathedral of the Immaculate Conception in Córdoba
- Cathedral of St. Anthony in Cuauhtémoc
- Cathedral of St. Bonaventure in Cuautitlán
- Cathedral of the Assumption of Mary in Cuernavaca
- Cathedral Basilica of Our Lady of the Rosary in Culiacán
- Cathedral Basilica of Our Lady in Durango
- Cathedral of the Sacred Heart of Jesus in Ecatepec de Morelos
- Cathedral of Our Lady of Guadalupe in El Salto
- Cathedral of Our Lady of Guadalupe in Ensenada
- Cathedral of Our Lady of Guadalupe in Gómez Palacio
- Cathedral Basilica of the Assumption of Our Lady in Guadalajara
- Cathedral of the Assumption in Hermosillo
- Cathedral of Our Lady of Guadalupe in Huajuapan de León
- Catedral de San Juan Evangelista in Huautla de Jiménez
- Cathedral of St. Augustine in Huejutla de Reyes
- Catedral de Nuestra Señora de la Soledad in Irapuato
- Catedral de Nuestra Señora de la Paz in La Paz
- Cathedral of Christ the King in Lázaro Cárdenas
- Cathedral Basilica of Our Lady of the Light in León
- Cathedral of St. Philip in Linares
- Cathedral of Our Lady of Refuge in Matamoros
- Cathedral of the Immaculate Conception in Matehuala
- Cathedral Basilica of the Immaculate Conception in Mazatlán
- Cathedral of St. Ildephonsus in Mérida
- Catedral de Nuestra Señora de Guadalupe in Mexicali
- Cathedral of the Assumption in Mexico City
- Cathedral of Our Lady of Monterrey in Monterrey
- Catedral de Morelia (San Salvador) in Morelia
- Cathedral of the Miraculous Medal in Nuevo Casas Grandes
- Catedral del Espíritu Santo (Cathedral of the Holy Spirit) in Nuevo Laredo
- Cathedral of Our Lady of the Assumption in Oaxaca
- Cathedral of St. Michael the Archangel in Orizaba
- Cathedral of the Assumption of Our Lady in Papantla
- Cathedral of St. Joseph in Parral
- Catedral Mártires de Cristo Rey in Piedras Negras
- Cathedral of the Immaculate Conception in Puebla
- Catedral de Nuestra Señora de la Soledad in Puerto Escondido
- Cathedral of St. Philip Neri in Querétaro
- Cathedral of St. James in Saltillo
- Cathedral of St. Joseph and St. Andrew in San Andrés Tuxtla
- Cathedral of San Cristóbal de las Casas
- Cathedral of St. John the Baptist in San Juan Bautista Tuxtepec
- Cathedral Basilica of Our Lady of San Juan de los Lagos in San Juan de los Lagos
- Cathedral of St. John the Baptist in San Juan Teotihuacan
- Metropolitan Cathedral of St. Louis the King in San Luis Potosí
- Cathedral of St. Dominic in Santo Domingo Tehuantepec
- Co-Cathedral of Sisoguichi
- Cathedral of St. Jerome in Tacámbaro
- Cathedral of the Immaculate Conception in Tampico
- Cathedral of St. Joseph in Tapachula
- Cathedral of the Immaculate Conception of Mary in Tehuacan
- Cathedral of the Calvary in Tenancingo
- Cathedral of the Immaculate Conception in Tepic
- Cathedral of the Immaculate Conception in Texcoco
- Our Lady of the Assumption Cathedral, Teziutlán
- Cathedral of Our Lady of Guadalupe in Tijuana
- New Cathedral of Our Lady of Guadalupe in Tijuana (under construction)
- Catedral de Corpus Christi in Tlalnepantla
- Cathedral of St. Augustine in Tlapa de Comonfort
- Cathedral of Our Lady of the Assumption in Tlaxcala
- Cathedral of St. Joseph of Nazareth in Toluca
- Catedral de Nuestra Señora de Carmen in Torreón
- Cathedral of St. John the Baptist in Tulancingo
- St. Joseph Cathedral, Tula de Allende
- St. Mark's Cathedral, Tuxtla Gutiérrez
- Catedral de Nuestra Señora de la Asunción in Tuxpan
- Cathedral of St. Juan Diego in Valle de Chalco
- Cathedral of the Assumption of Mary in Veracruz
- Cathedral of the Lord in Villahermosa
- Cathedral of the Immaculate Conception in Xalapa
- Cathedral Basilica of Our Lady of the Assumption in Zacatecas
- Cathedral of the Immaculate Conception of Mary in Zamora

== Eastern Catholic ==
- Maronite Church of Nuestra Señora de Valvanera in Mexico City (Maronite Rite)

== See also ==
- List of cathedrals
- Roman and Eastern Catholicism in Mexico
