= Roman Catholic Diocese of Saltillo =

Latin Catholic jurisdiction in Mexico

Diocese of Saltillo Dioecesis Saltillensis Diócesis de Saltillo
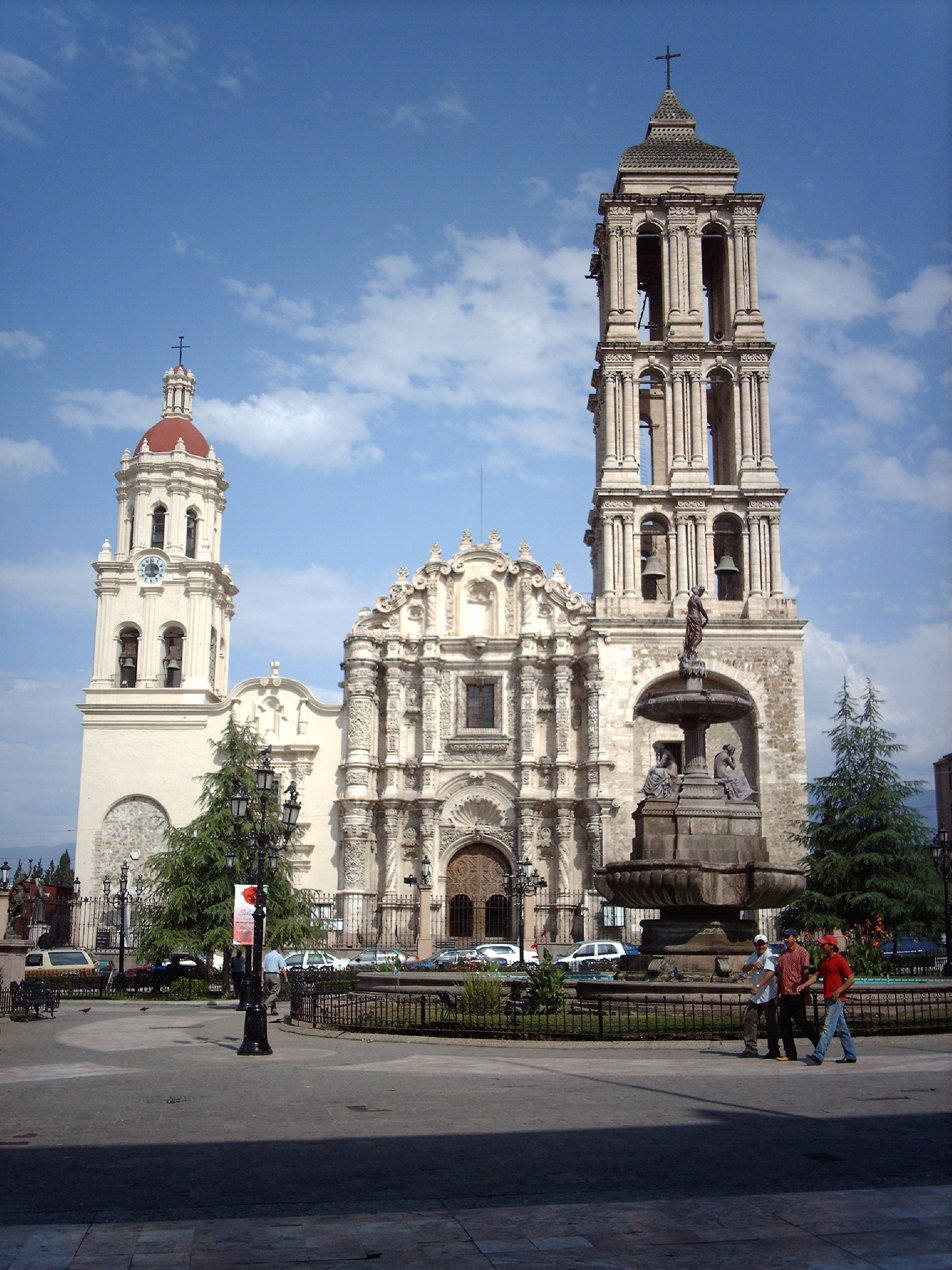
- Catedral de Santiago

Location
- Country: Mexico
- Ecclesiastical province: Monterrey

Statistics
- Area: 21,864 sq mi (56,630 km^{2})
- Population: Total; Catholics: (as of 2004); 546,576; 524,987 (96.1%)
- Parishes: 60

Information
- Denomination: Catholic Church
- Sui iuris church: Latin Church
- Rite: Roman Rite
- Established: 23 June 1891 (135 years ago)
- Cathedral: Cathedral of St. James

Current leadership
- Pope: Leo XIV
- Bishop: Hilario González García
- Metropolitan Archbishop: Rogelio Cabrera López
- Bishops emeritus: José Raúl Vera López, O.P.

Map
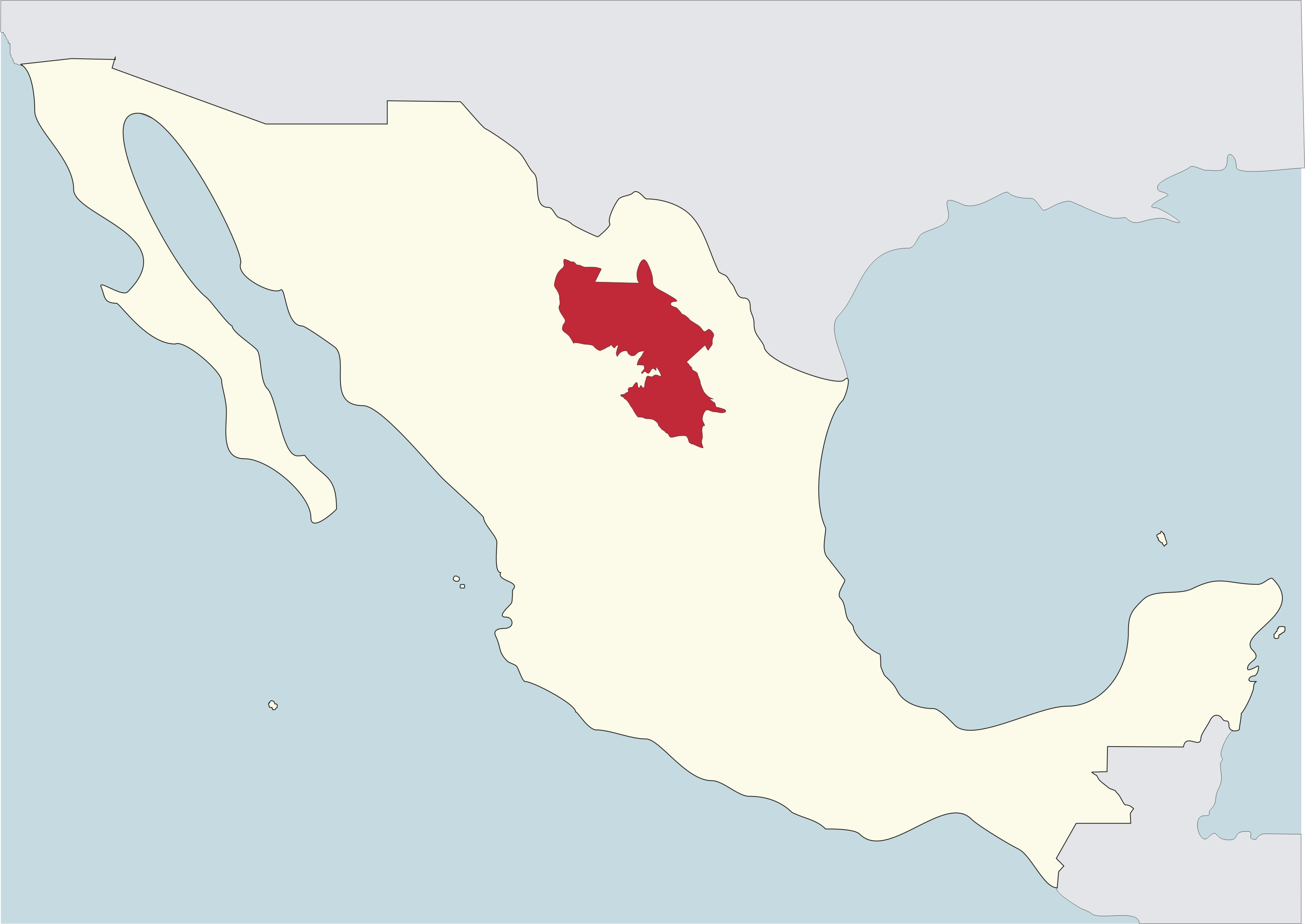

Website
- www.diocesisdesaltillo.org.mx

The Diocese of Saltillo (Latin: Dioecesis Saltillensis) is a Latin Church ecclesiastical territory or diocese of the Catholic Church in Mexico. The diocese was erected on 23 June 1891. It is a suffragan in the ecclesiastical province of the metropolitan Archdiocese of Monterrey.

== History ==
The Franciscan priest Andres de Leon was one of the first missionaries in this territory in the sixteenth century. In 1827 the name of Saltillo was changed to Ciudad Leona Vicario, in honor of the Mexican heroine of that name, but the original name always prevailed. The Franciscans of the Province of Jalisco had eight missions in Coahuila, which, in 1777, formed part of the See of Linares, or Monterey, and belonged to it until 1891, when Pope Leo XIII erected the See of Saltillo with jurisdiction over the entire State of Coahuila.

According to the Catholic News Agency (CNA), Vera Lopez, the bishop of Saltillo, Mexico, will meet with Marc Ouellet, the Cardinal Prefect of the Congregation for Bishops in the Vatican's Roman Curia, "to discuss Bishop Vera's support for the San Elredo Community, an organization that embraces homosexuality." The San Elredo Community has become a separate organization apart from the Diocese of Saltillo.

== Bishops ==
=== Ordinaries ===
- Santiago de los Santos Garza Zambrano (1893–1898), appointed the bishop of León, Guanajuato
- José María de Jesús Portugal y Serratos (1898–1902), appointed the bishop of Aguascalientes
- Jesús María Echavarría y Aguirre (1904–1954)
- Luis Guízar y Barragán (1954–1975)
- Francisco Raúl Villalobos Padilla (1975–1999)
- José Raúl Vera López, the bishop emeritus
- Hilario González García (2020–present)

=== Coadjutor bishop ===
- Luis Guízar y Barragán (1938–1954)

=== Auxiliary bishops ===
- Manuel Samaniego Barriga (1969–1971), appointed the bishop of Ciudad Altamirano, Guerrero
- Francisco Raúl Villalobos Padilla (1971–1975), appointed a bishop here

== Territorial losses ==
Date	Reason
19 June 1957	to form the Diocese of Torreón
8 January 2003	to form the Diocese of Piedras Negras

== Episcopal See ==
- Saltillo, Coahuila

== External links and references ==
- "Diocese of Saltillo". Catholic-Hierarchy.
