= Guillermo Ortiz =

Guillermo Ortiz may refer to:

- Guillermo Ortiz (Argentine footballer) (born 1992), Argentine football centre-back
- Guillermo Ortiz Martínez (born 1948), Mexican economist, governor of the Bank of Mexico in 1998–2009
- Guillermo Ortiz (Mexican footballer) (Guillermo Ortiz Camargo, 1939–2009), Mexican football forward
- Guillermo Ortiz Mondragón (1947–2021), Mexican prelate of the Roman Catholic Church, bishop of Cuautitlán
- Guillermo Álvaro Ortiz Carrillo (1924–2000), Colombian prelate of the Roman Catholic Church, coadjutor bishop of the diocese of Garagoa
- Guillermo Iberio Ortiz Mayagoitia (born 1941), Mexican jurist, president of the Supreme Court in 2007–2010
