= Cuautitlán Cathedral =

Coordinates: 19.6689°N 99.1787°W

St. Bonaventure Cathedral
- Catedral de San Buenaventura
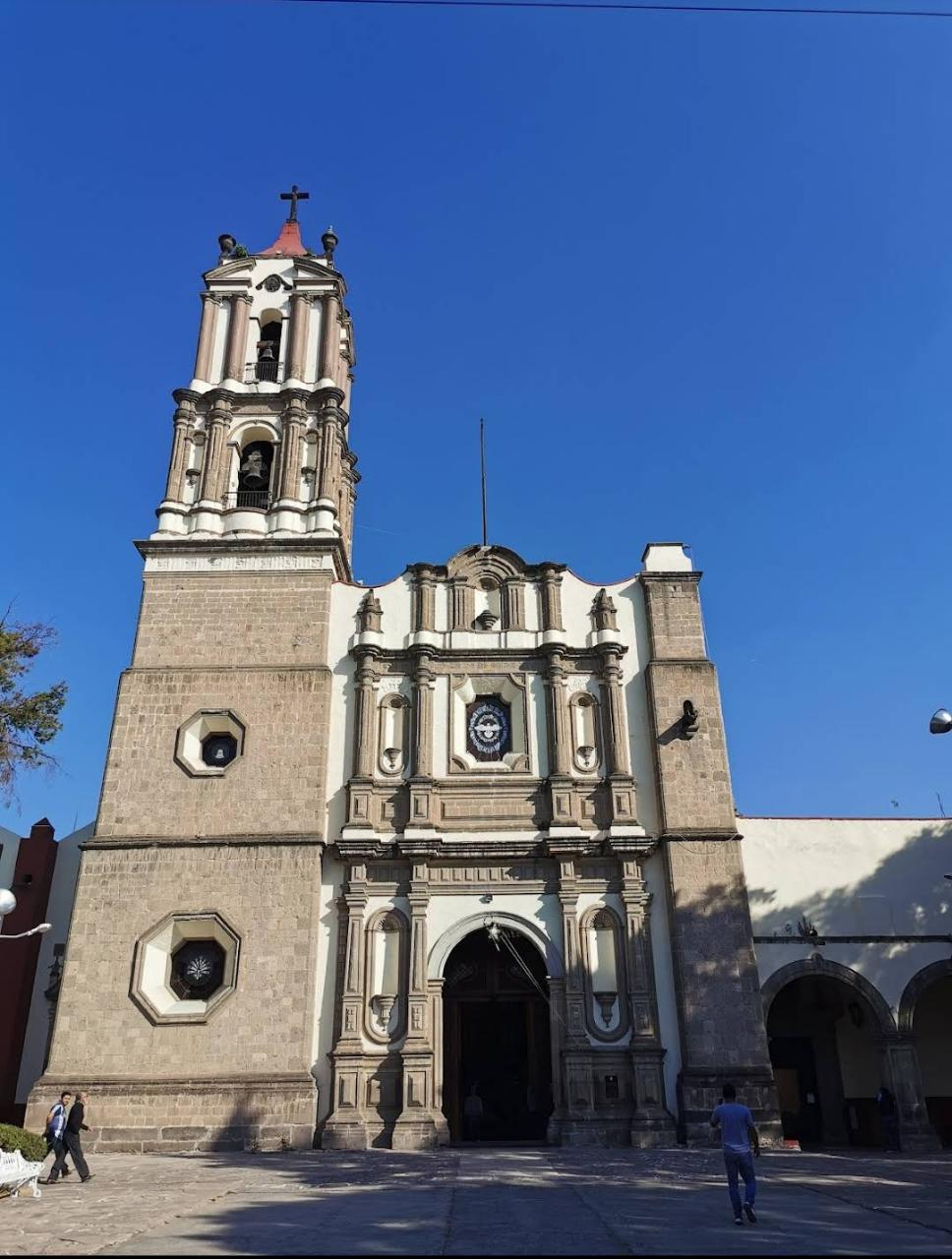
- St. Bonaventure Cathedral
- Location: Cuautitlán
- Country: Mexico
- Denomination: Roman Catholic Church

The St. Bonaventure Cathedral (also Cuautitlán Cathedral; Spanish: Catedral de San Buenaventura) is a Catholic church, part of the convent of the same name in the Municipality of Cuautitlán, State of Mexico. It was designated as a cathedral on February 5, 1979, with the founding of the Diocese of Cuautitlán.

The complex is named after St. Bonaventure (San Buenaventura) after the day's saint on the date of the first visit of the first friars in 1524. It was not until 1532, however, when the planned construction of what was the first Franciscan monastery and temple began in Cuautitlán, with Friar Alonso de Herrera as the first guardian and Friar Alonso de Guadalupe as the first conventual.

The current cathedral (the third convent) was built between 1655 and 1732.

The cathedral combines two styles, Baroque and Neoclassical.

The cathedral has a Latin cross plan with elevated proportions, and a nave with transept of Baroque columns.

== See also ==
- Roman Catholicism in Mexico
- St. Bonaventure
