= Manuel Samaniego Barriga =

Mexican bishop

- Bishop of Cuautitlán
- Church: Catholic Church
- Diocese: Diocese of Cuautitlán
- In office: 5 February 1979 – 26 June 2005
- Predecessor: Diocese erected
- Successor: Guillermo Ortiz Mondragón
- Previous posts: Bishop of Ciudad Altamirano (1971-1979); Titular Bishop of Cures Sabinorum (1969-1971); Auxiliary Bishop of Saltillo (1969-1971)

Orders
- Ordination: 19 December 1953
- Consecration: 6 August 1969 by Luis Guízar Barragán

Personal details
- Born: 10 October 1930 Angamacutiro, Michoacán, Mexico
- Died: 26 June 2005 (aged 74)

Manuel Samaniego Barriga (Angamacatiro, 10 October 1930 – 26 June 2005) was a Mexican clergyman and auxiliary bishop for the Roman Catholic Diocese of Saltillo, and later for Ciudad Altamirano and Cuautitlán.

He became ordained in 1953 and was appointed bishop in 1969. He was bishop of Altamirano from 1971 to 1979 and then bishop of Cuautitlan until his death in 2005.

His brother Tarsicio was a priest and college professor.
