= Diocese of Irapuato =

Roman Catholic diocese in Mexico

Coordinates: 20.6746°N 101.3466°W

Diocese of Irapuato Dioecesis Irapuatensis Diócesis de Irapuato
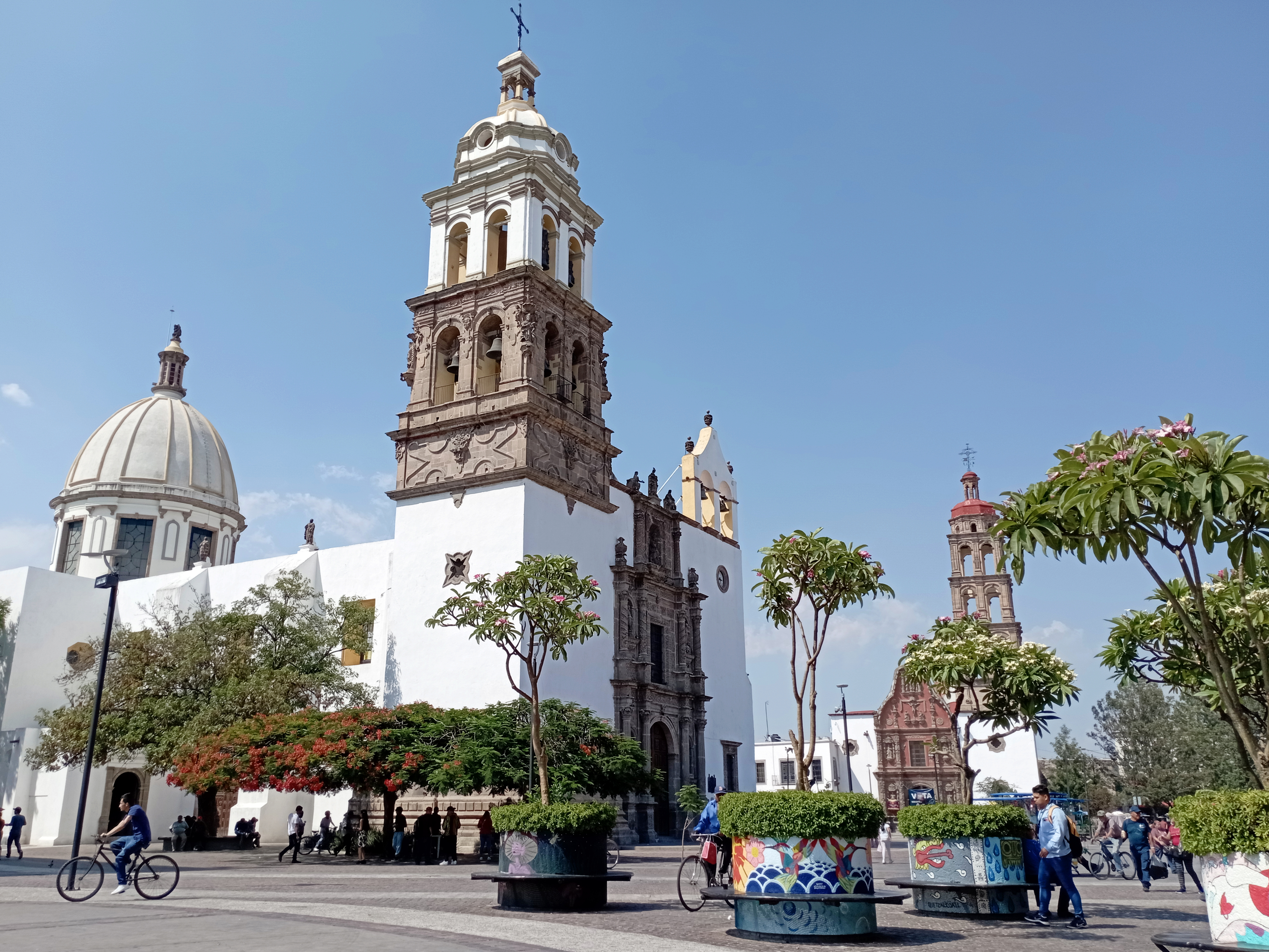
- Catedral de Nuestra Señora de la Limpia Concepción de María

Location
- Country: Mexico
- Ecclesiastical province: Province of León
- Metropolitan: Irapuato, Guanajuato

Statistics
- Area: 1,844 sq mi (4,780 km^{2})
- Population: Total; Catholics: (as of 2006); 1,094,160; 1,077,110 (98.4%)
- Parishes: 61

Information
- Denomination: Roman Catholic
- Rite: Roman Rite
- Established: 3 January 2004 (22 years ago)
- Cathedral: Cathedral of Our Lady of Solitude

Current leadership
- Pope: Leo XIV
- Bishop: Enrique Díaz Díaz
- Metropolitan Archbishop: Alfonso Cortés Contreras
- Bishops emeritus: José de Jesús Martínez Zepeda

Map
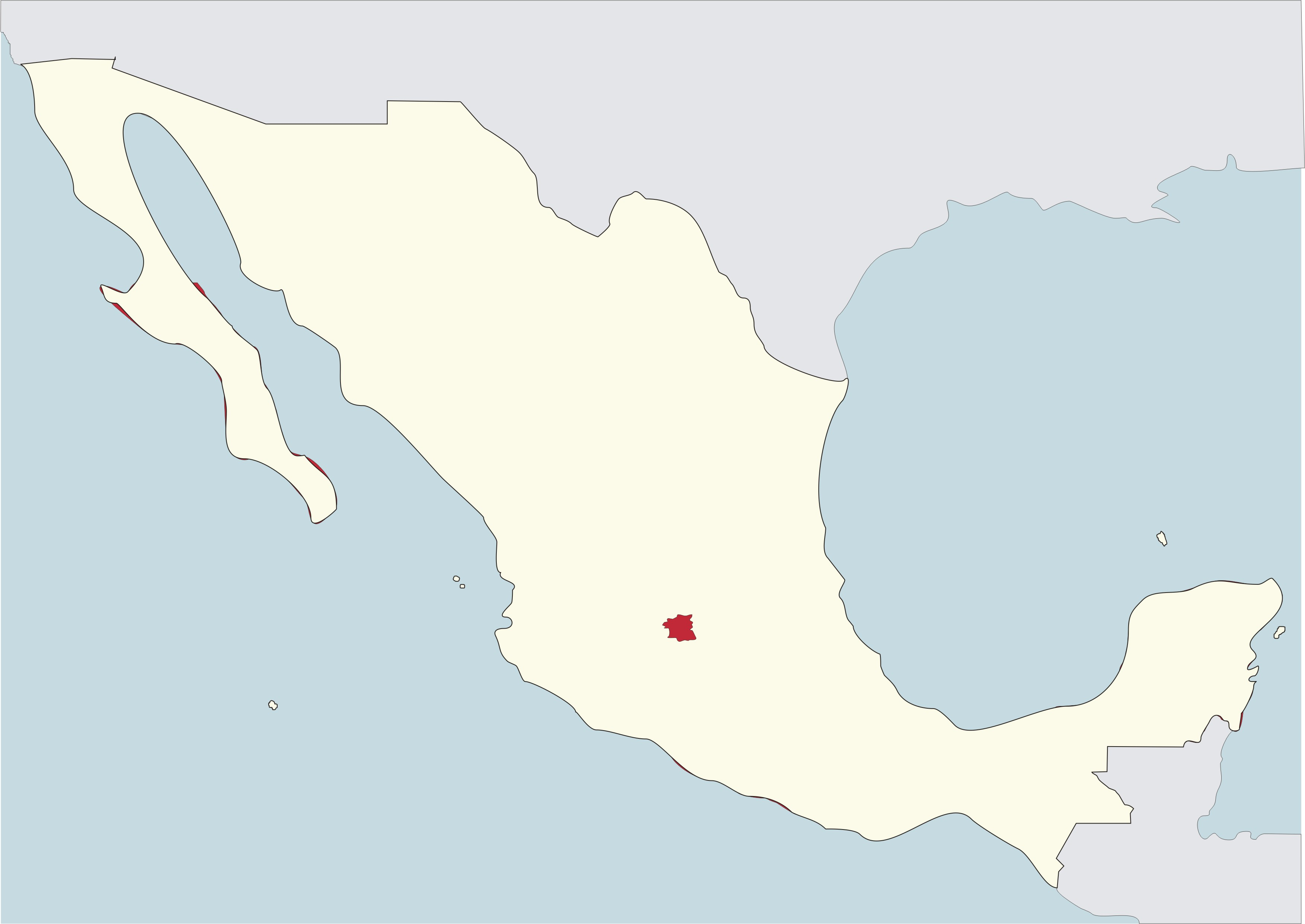

The Roman Catholic Diocese of Irapuato (Latin: Dioecesis Irapuatensis) is a Latin suffragan diocese in the ecclesiastical province of the Metropolitan Archdiocese of León in southern Mexico.

Its cathedral Episcopal see is Catedral de Nuestra Señora de la Soledad, at Irapuato, Guanajuato.

== History ==
Established on 3 January 2004 as Diocese of Irapuato / Irapuaten(sis) (Latin adjective), on territories split off from the Diocese of León and the Metropolitan Archdiocese of Morelia. It was a suffragan of the Metropolitan Archdiocese of San Luis Potosí until 25 November 2006.

Luis Esteban Zavala Rodríguez, a diocesan priest, was condemned to 65 years and three months in prison and fined MXN $61,000 in January 2021 for raping a 12-year-old girl as she took catechism classes at a church in Irapuato. The diocese released a statement saying it was respectful of the civil authorities and committed to truth and transparency, "as well as to respect and protection of any person, without discrimination, particularly with children, adolescents, and young people, and with vulnerable people ”.

== Statistics ==
As per 2014, it pastorally served 1,427,998 Catholics (98.4% of 1,451,090 total) on 4,775 km^{2} in 68 parishes and 38 missions with 168 priests (123 diocesan, 45 religious), 2 deacons, 278 lay religious (50 brothers, 228 sisters) and 75 seminarians.

== Bishops ==
(all Roman Rite)

=== Episcopal ordinaries ===
Suffragan Bishops of Irapuato

- José de Jesús Martínez Zepeda (2004.01.03 – retired 2017.03.11), previously Titular Bishop of Naratcata (1997.03.11 – 2004.01.03) as Auxiliary Bishop of México (City, capital of Mexico) (1997.03.11 – 2004.01.03)
- Enrique Díaz Díaz (2017.03.11 – ...), previously Titular Bishop of Izirzada (2003.04.30 – 2014.05.15) as Auxiliary Bishop of San Cristóbal de las Casas (Mexico) (2003.04.30 – 2014.05.15), next Coadjutor Bishop of San Cristóbal de las Casas (2014.05.15 – 2017.03.11).

=== Other priests of this diocese who became bishops ===
- José Guadalupe Torres Campos, appointed Auxiliary Bishop of Ciudad Juárez, Chihuahua in 2005
- Francisco González Ramos, appointed Bishop of Izcalli, México in 2014

== See also ==
- List of Catholic dioceses in Mexico

== Sources and external links ==
- GCatholic, with Google photo - data for all sections
- "Diocese of Irapuato". Catholic-Hierarchy.
