= Francisco Raúl Villalobos Padilla =

Mexican bishop (1921–2022)

- Bishop of Diocese of Saltillo Emeritus
- Church: Roman Catholic Church
- See: Diocese of Saltillo
- In office: 1975–1999
- Predecessor: Luis Guízar y Barragán
- Successor: José Raúl Vera López

Orders
- Ordination: 2 April 1949

Personal details
- Born: 1 February 1921; Guadalajara, Mexico
- Died: 3 February 2022 (aged 101); Saltillo, Coahuila, Mexico

Francisco Raúl Villalobos Padilla (1 February 1921 – 3 February 2022) was a Mexican bishop of the Roman Catholic Church.

== Biography ==
Villalobos Padilla was born in Guadalajara, and ordained a priest on 2 April 1949. He was appointed auxiliary bishop of the Roman Catholic Diocese of Saltillo on 4 May 1971 as well as Titular bishop of Columnata and consecrated on 4 August 1971. He was appointed bishop of Saltillo on 4 October 1975, retiring from the post on 30 December 1999.

He turned 100 in 2021, and died from COVID-19 in Saltillo, Coahuila, on 3 February 2022, at the age of 101.
