= Irapuato Cathedral =

Coordinates: 20.6750°N 101.3467°W

Our Lady of the Immaculate Conception
- Catedral de Nuestra Señora de la Limpia Concepción de María
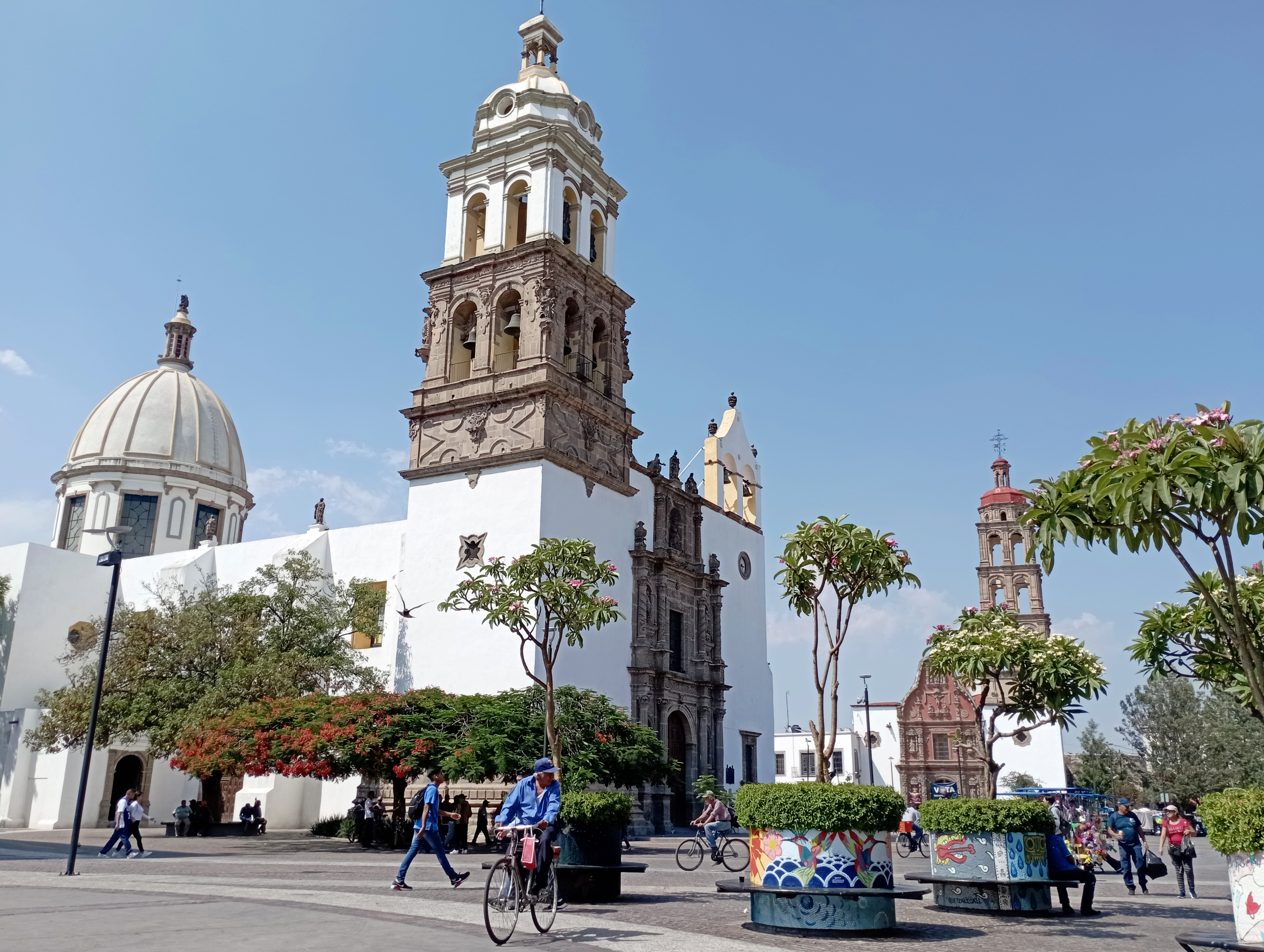
- Our Lady of the Immaculate Conception
- Location: Irapuato
- Country: Mexico
- Denomination: Roman Catholic Church

Our Lady of the Immaculate Conception Cathedral (also called Irapuato Cathedral; Spanish: Catedral de Nuestra Señora de la Soledad) is the main Roman Catholic church in Irapuato, Mexico. It is located in front of the Plaza Monumental Miguel Hidalgo. It is the mother church of the Diocese of Irapuato, which is the seat of the bishopric.

The date of its construction is unknown, but according to a census carried out by the Bishop of Michoacán, it existed as a parish in 1631. Its cathedral rank was granted in 2004 by Pope John Paul II.

== Design ==
Like most Baroque Catholic churches, it was designed in a Latin cross plan. Its vault consists of a corrugated canon with a polygonal cross-section, and its side arches (formeros) and sub-arches (torales) are also polygonal. Its internal spaciousness stands out for its scale given the modest locality at the time.

== See also ==
- Roman Catholicism in Mexico
- Roman Catholic Diocese of Irapuato
