= Diocese of Piedras Negras =

Latin Catholic jurisdiction in Mexico

Diocese of Piedras Negras Dioecesis Saxanigrensis Diócesis de Piedras Negras
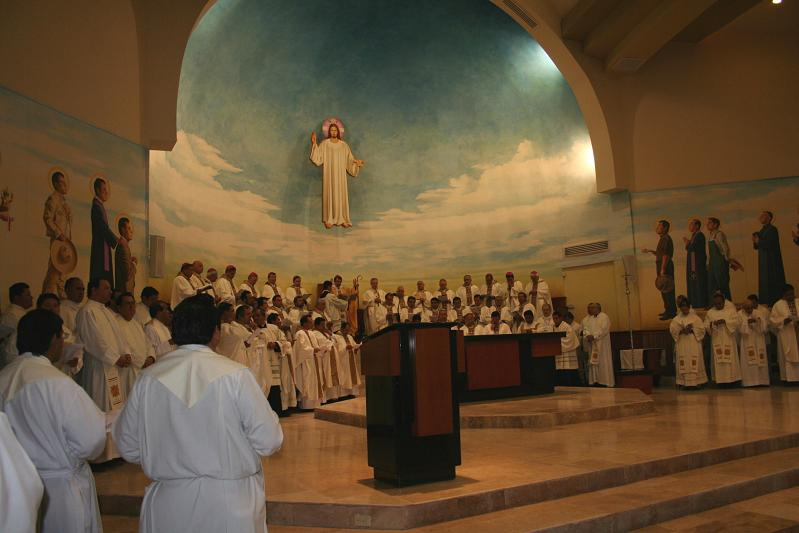
- Catedral Mártires de Cristo Rey

Location
- Country: Mexico
- Metropolitan: Archdiocese of Monterrey
- Headquarters: Piedras Negras, Coahuila, Mexico

Statistics
- Area: 56,608 km^{2} (21,856 sq mi)
- Population: Total; Catholics: (as of 2023); 630,000; 445,500 (70.7%)
- Parishes: 42

Information
- Denomination: Catholic Church
- Sui iuris church: Latin Church
- Rite: Roman Rite
- Established: 8 January 2003; 23 years ago
- Cathedral: Piedras Negras Cathedral
- Secular priests: 76 (62 Diocesan, 14 Religious Orders)

Current leadership
- Pope: Leo XIV
- Bishop: Alfonso Gerardo Miranda Guardiola
- Metropolitan Archbishop: Rogelio Cabrera López
- Bishops emeritus: Alonso Gerardo Garza Treviño

Map
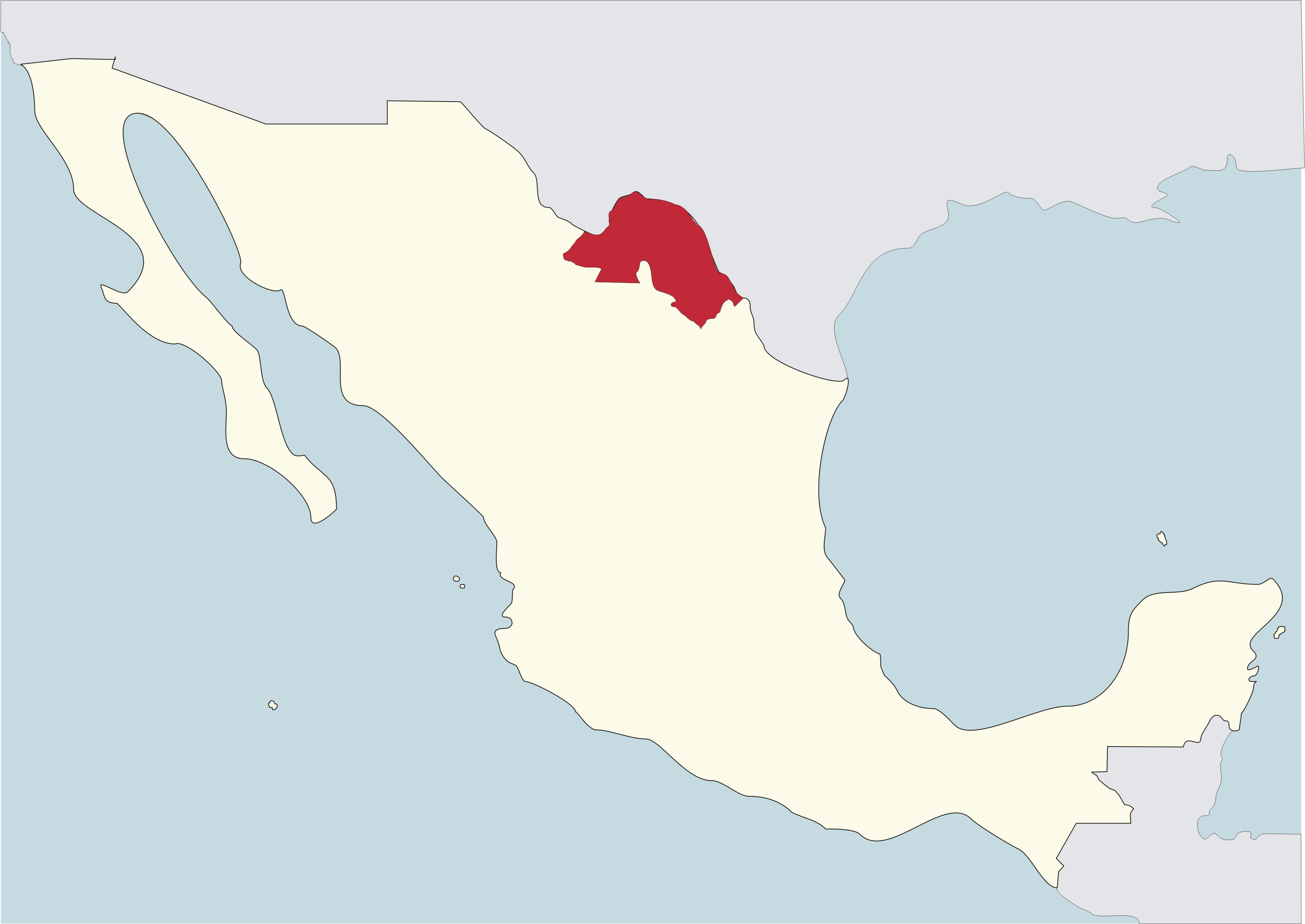

The Diocese of Piedras Negras (Latin: Dioecesis Saxanigrensis) is a Latin Church ecclesiastical territory or diocese of the Catholic Church in Mexico. It is a suffragan in the ecclesiastical province of the metropolitan Archdiocese of Monterrey. The diocese was erected on 8 January 2003. Its cathedra is found within the Catedral Mártires de Cristo Rey in the episcopal see of Piedras Negras, Coahuila.

== Leadership ==
=== Bishops of Piedras Negras ===
- Alonso Gerardo Garza Treviño (8 January 2003 – 8 June 2024), retired
- Alfonso Gerardo Miranda Guardiola (8 June 2024 – Present)
