= Villahermosa Cathedral =

Coordinates: 17.9892°N 92.9281°W

Cathedral of the Lord
- Catedral del Señor de Villahermosa
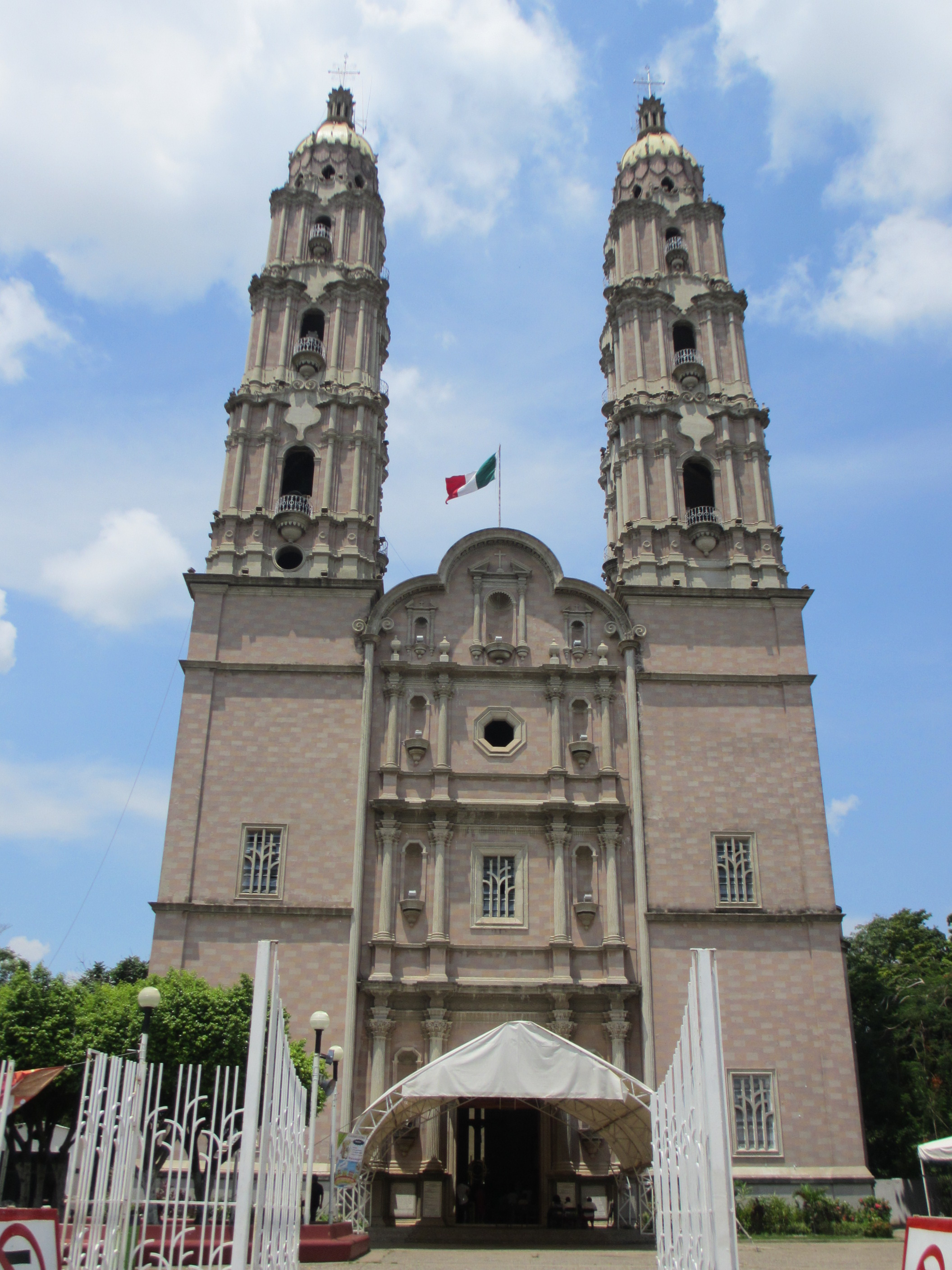
- Cathedral of the Lord
- Location: Villahermosa
- Country: Mexico
- Denomination: Roman Catholic Church

The Cathedral of the Lord (Spanish: Catedral del Señor de Villahermosa) Also Villahermosa Cathedral or Tabasco Cathedral Is the main Catholic cathedral of the city of Villahermosa, in Mexico, and the central church of the Diocese of Tabasco.

The first church built in its present location dates back to 1776 known as the Church of the Lord of Esquipulas, named after because it was built in honor of the Lord of Esquipulas, a black Christ brought from the population of Esquipulas, Guatemala and that on March 18, 1774, was donated by the Bishop of Yucatán Don Diego de Peredo.

On April 16, 1884, Bishop Agustín de Jesus Torres Hernández placed the first stone of the new Cathedral of Tabasco, however, it was not possible to finish its construction, so the Cathedral of Esquipulas continued to be the Cathedral of Tabasco until 1928 when it was closed due to the anti-religious campaign undertaken by then-state governor Tomás Garrido Canabal, which ordered the closure of churches and destruction of religious images throughout the state. In 1930 the cathedral was sacked, burned and destroyed religious images, to be converted into "Rationalist School". Finally, in 1934 it was demolished.

After the stage of Garridismo, the Bishop of Tabasco José de Jesús del Valle y Navarro began in 1945 the reconstruction of the cathedral with the name of Cathedral of the Lord of Tabasco, named after an image that the bishop donated,. The construction was concluded in 1970. On May 11, 1990, the cathedral was consecrated and blessed by SS. John Paul II in solemn Mass, during his visit to the city of Villahermosa.

== See also ==
- Roman Catholicism in Mexico
- Jesus is Lord

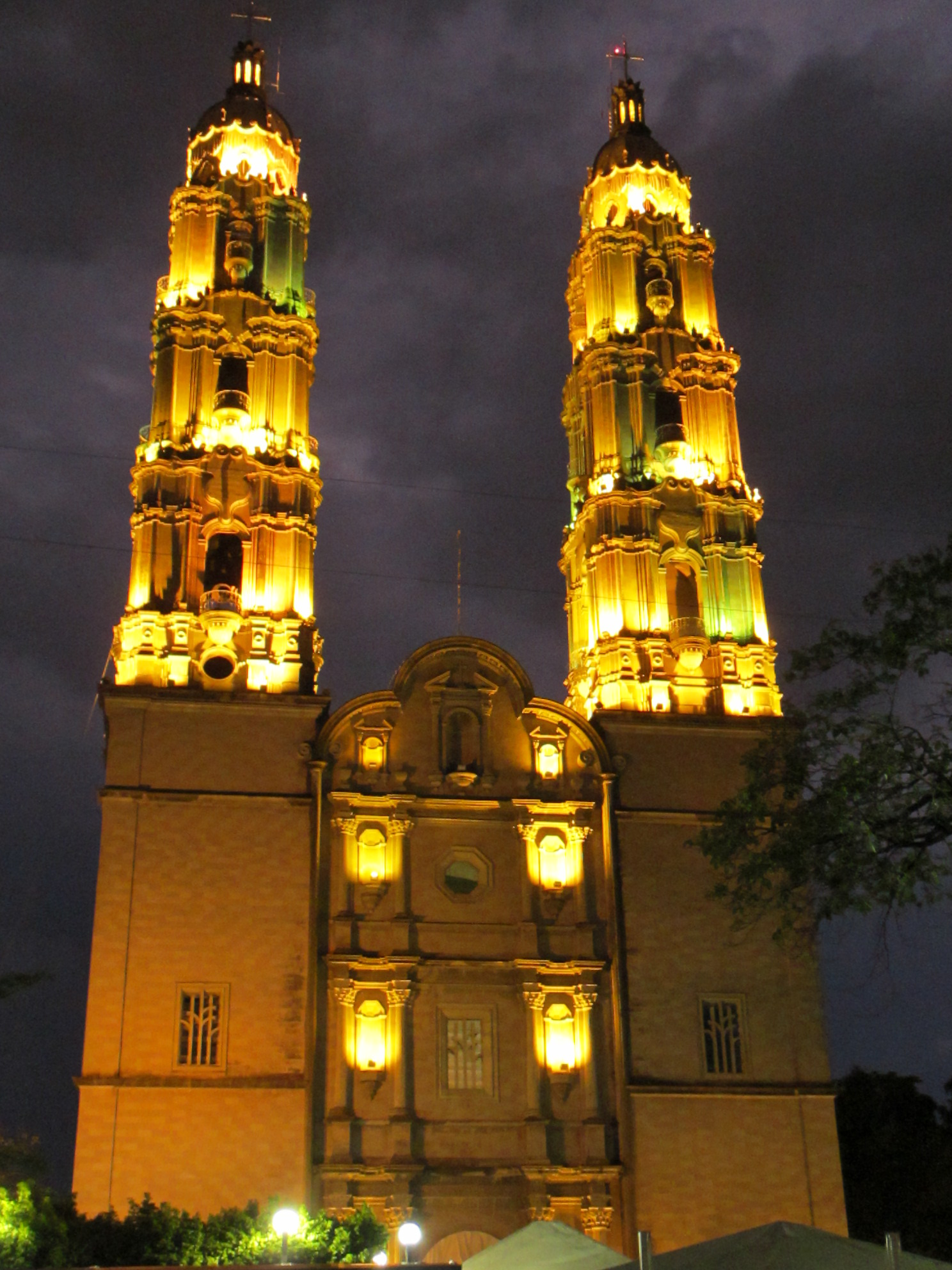
Another View
