= Sacred Heart of Jesus Cathedral, Ciudad Obregón =

Sacred Heart of Jesus Cathedral
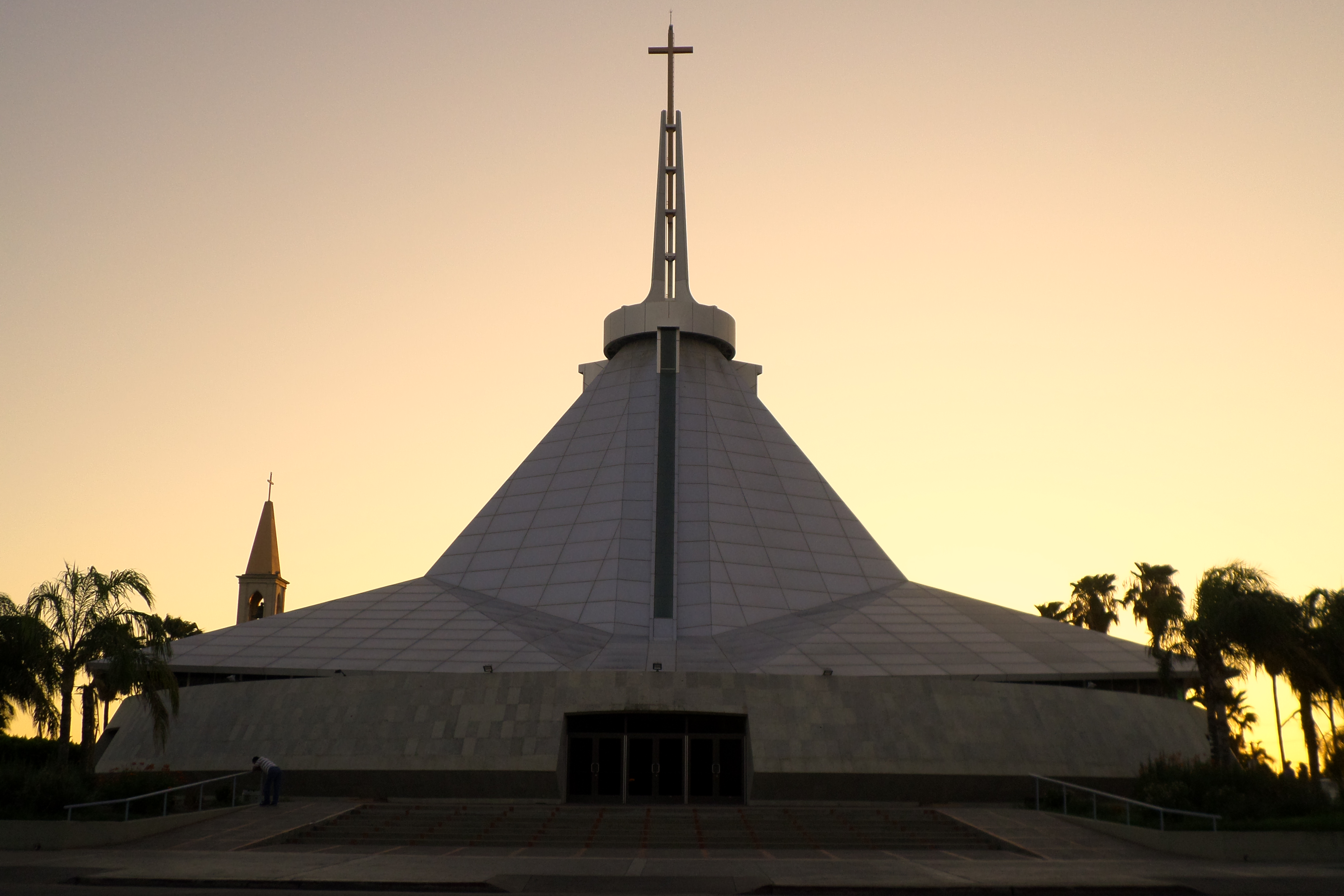
- Sacred Heart of Jesus Cathedral
- 27°29′51″N 109°56′0″W
- Location: Ciudad Obregón
- Country: Mexico
- Denomination: Roman Catholic Church

The Sacred Heart of Jesus Cathedral (Spanish: Catedral del Sagrado Corazón de Jesús) Also Ciudad Obregón Cathedral Is a Catholic church seat of the Diocese of Ciudad Obregón, in Mexico, is one of the most recent cathedrals of the country, since it was erected at the end of the 20th century. It is dedicated to the Sacred Heart of Jesus.

Of modern style, it emphasizes its enormous ceiling, in form of truncated prism, on which a great cross rises.

In the interior you can see an enormous altarpiece with images carved in marble and decorations with gold and bronze leaf.

== See also ==
- Roman Catholicism in Mexico

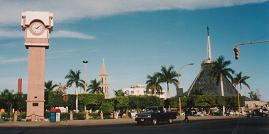
View of Alvaro Obregon Square, with the cathedral in the background
