= Martyrs of Christ the King Cathedral, Piedras Negras =

Martyrs of Christ the King Cathedral
- Catedral Mártires de Cristo Rey
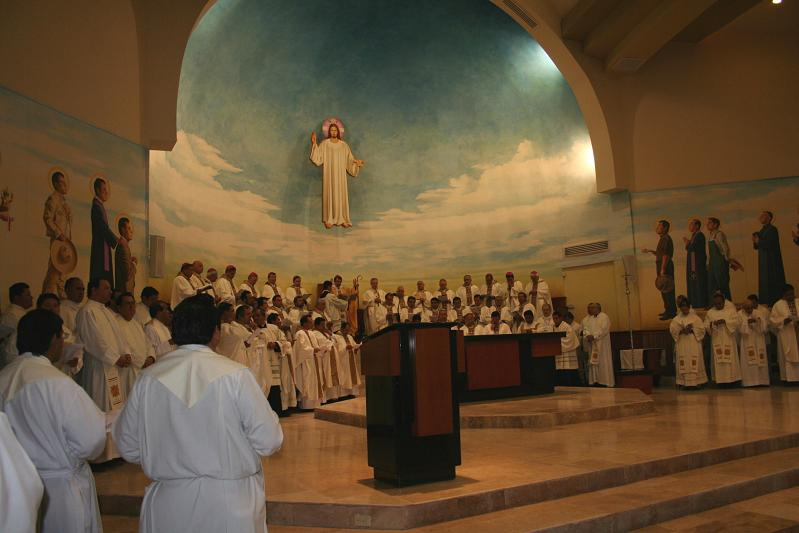
- Martyrs of Christ the King Cathedral
- Location: Piedras Negras
- Country: Mexico
- Denomination: Roman Catholic Church
- Sui iuris church: Latin Church

History
- Status: Cathedral
- Founded: 1994
- Dedication: Saints of the Cristero War; Christ the King
- Consecrated: March 8, 2008

Architecture
- Functional status: Active
- Years built: 1990s-2008
- Groundbreaking: 1990s
- Completed: 2008

Administration
- Archdiocese: Archdiocese of Monterrey
- Diocese: Diocese of Piedras Negras

Clergy
- Archbishop: Rogelio Cabrera López
- Bishop: Alfonso Gerardo Miranda Guardiola

The Martyrs of Christ the King Cathedral (also Piedras Negras Cathedral; Spanish: Catedral Mártires de Cristo Rey) is a Catholic church that serves as the cathedral of the city of Piedras Negras to the northeast of the state of Coahuila in Mexico, near the border with the Texan city of Eagle Pass. Located inside the Residencial Tecnológico, it is one of the modern jewels of the city.

In March 2008, the Martyrs of Christ the King Cathedral, home of the Diocese of Piedras Negras, was headed by the Apostolic Nuncio Christophe Pierre, the Cardinal of Monterrey Francisco Robles Ortega and seventeen bishops, in addition to the presence of the hierarchy of the Catholic Church in Mexico.

== See also ==
- Roman Catholicism in Mexico
- Christ the King
