= Diocese of Cuautitlán =

Roman Catholic diocese in Mexico

Coordinates: 19.6690°N 99.1796°W

Diocese of Cuautitlán Dioecesis Cuautitlanensis Diócesis de Cuautitlán

Location
- Country: Mexico
- Ecclesiastical province: Tlalnepantla

Statistics
- Area: 1,119 km^{2} (432 sq mi)
- Population: Total; Catholics: (as of 2014); 3,818,270; 1,360,677 (35.6%)
- Parishes: 61

Information
- Denomination: Catholic Church
- Rite: Roman Rite
- Established: 5 February 1979 (47 years ago)
- Cathedral: Catedral de San Buenaventura

Current leadership
- Pope: Leo XIV
- Bishop: Efraín Mendoza Cruz

Map
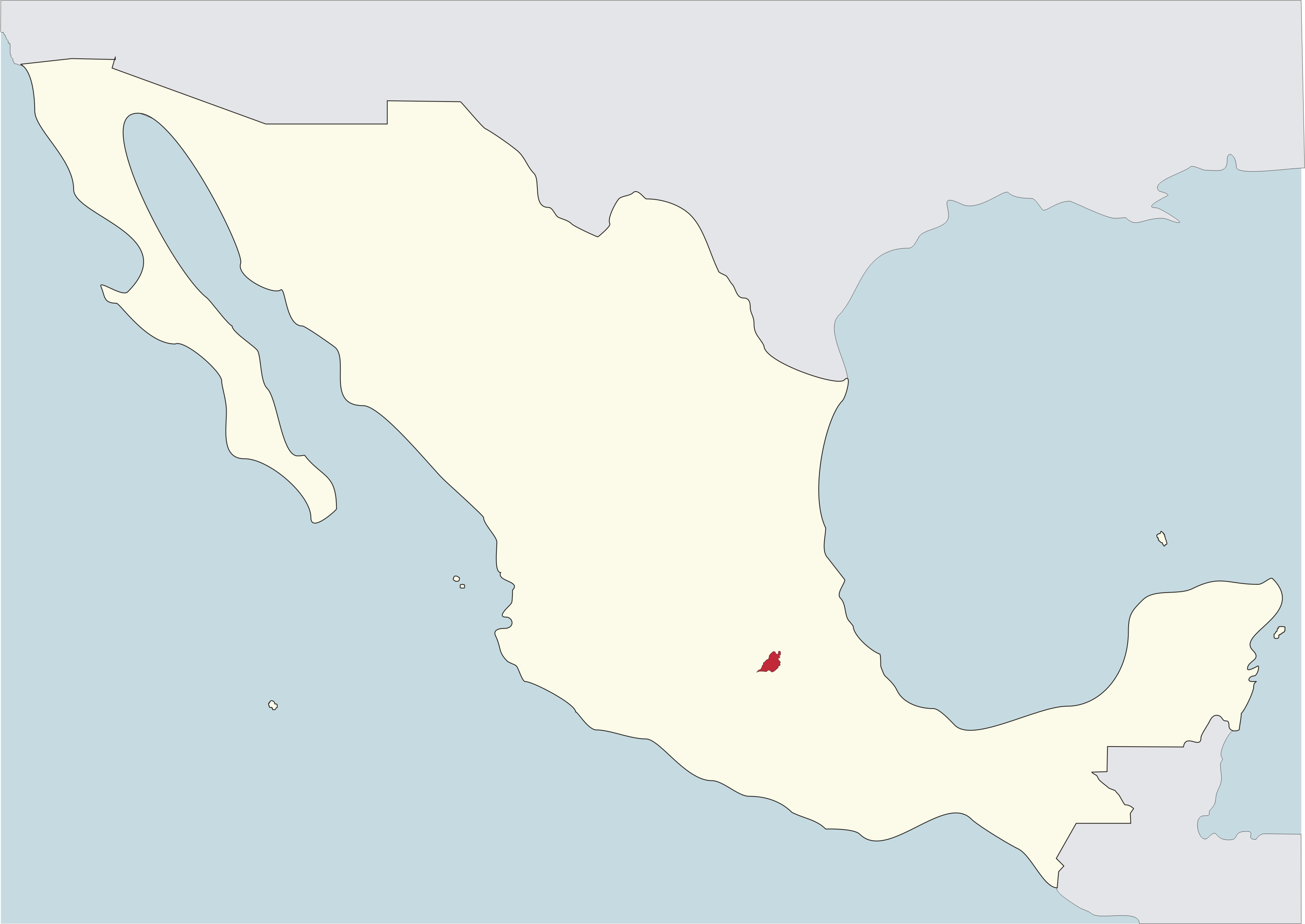

Website
- www.diocesisdecuautitlan.net

The Roman Catholic Diocese of Cuautitlán (Latin: Dioecesis Cuautitlanensis) is based in the city of Cuautitlán, State of Mexico, Mexico. It is a suffragan diocese of the Archdiocese of Tlalnepantla.

== History ==
Pope John Paul II established the diocese on 5 February 1979. On 9 June 2014, Pope Francis erected the new Diocese of Izcalli with territory taken from the diocese.

== Ordinaries ==
- Manuel Samaniego Barriga (1979 - 2005)
- Guillermo Ortiz Mondragón (2005 - 2021); died in office on September 14, 2021
- Efraín Mendoza Cruz (2022 - present)

== Gallery ==
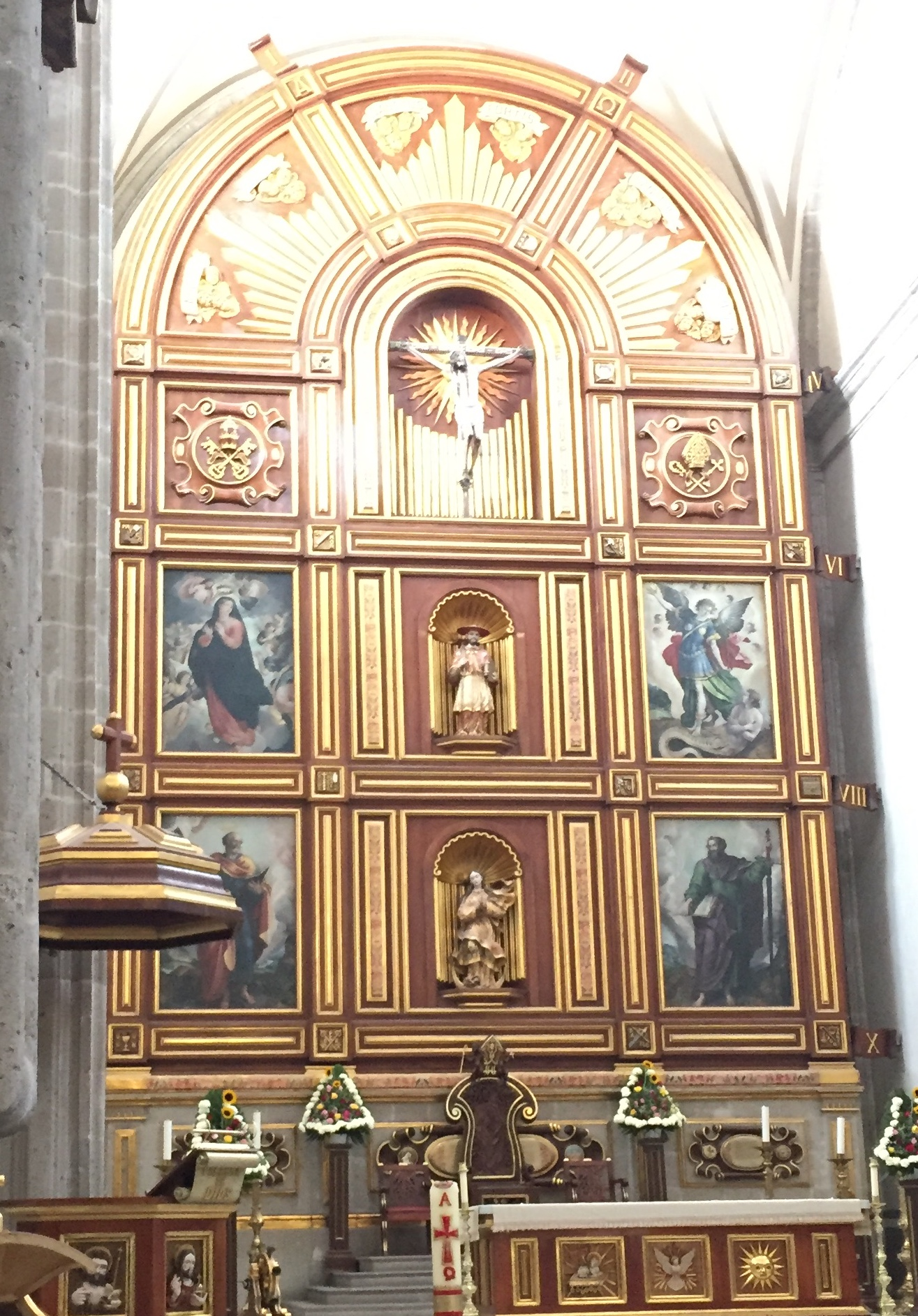
Main altar of the church

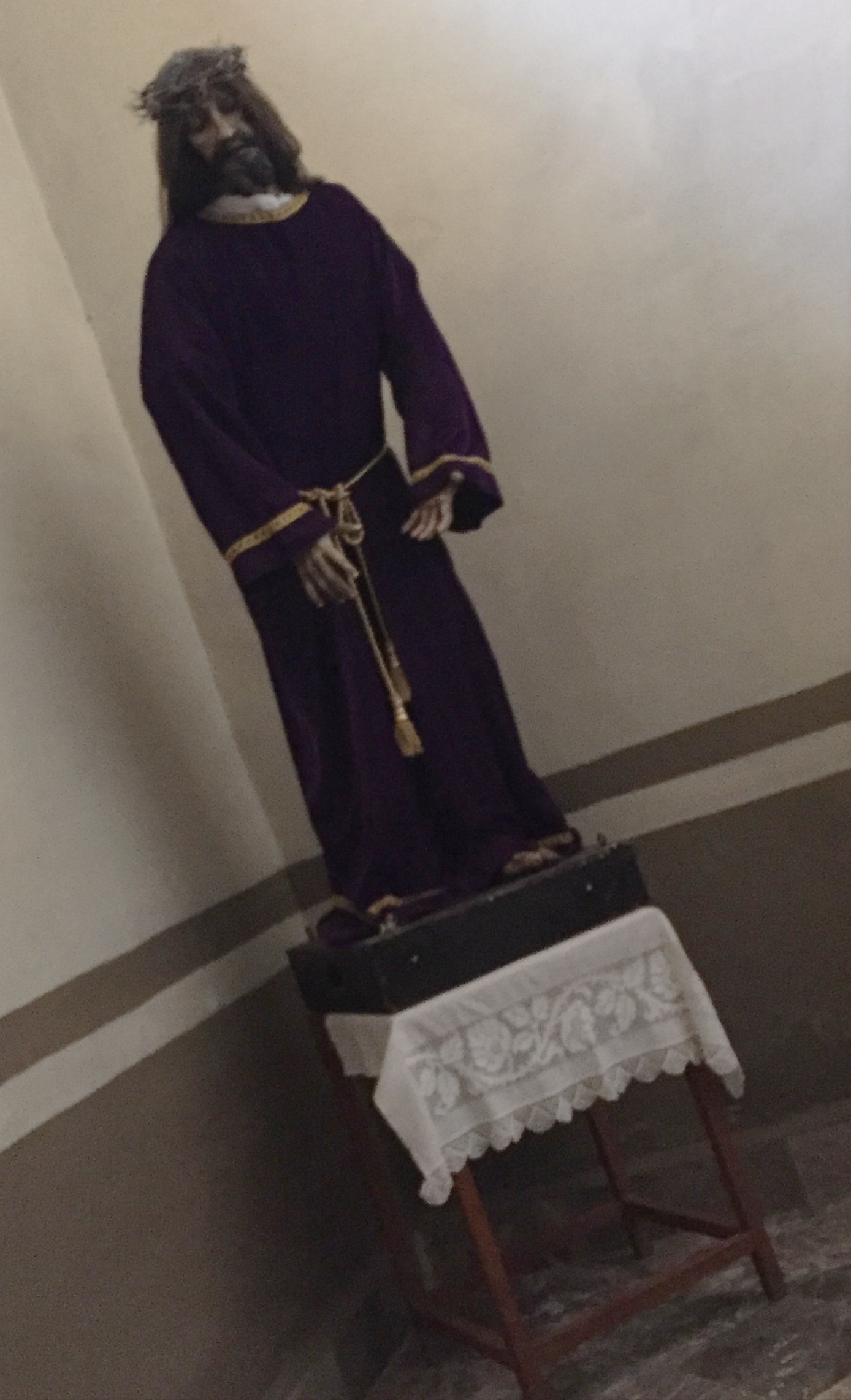
Statue of Jesus inside the church

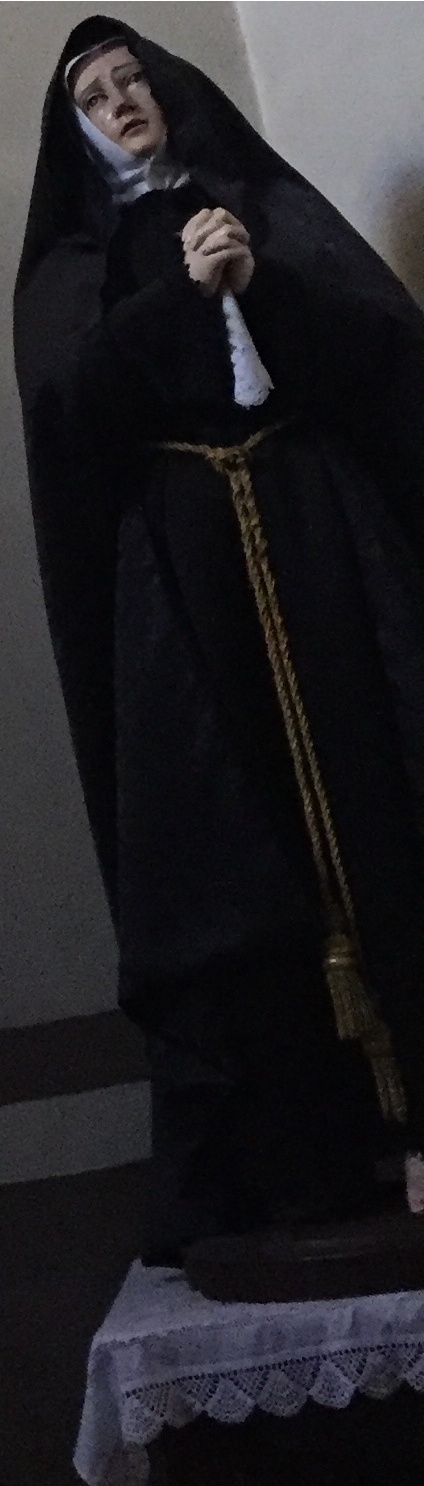
Statue of Our Lady of Sorrows inside the church

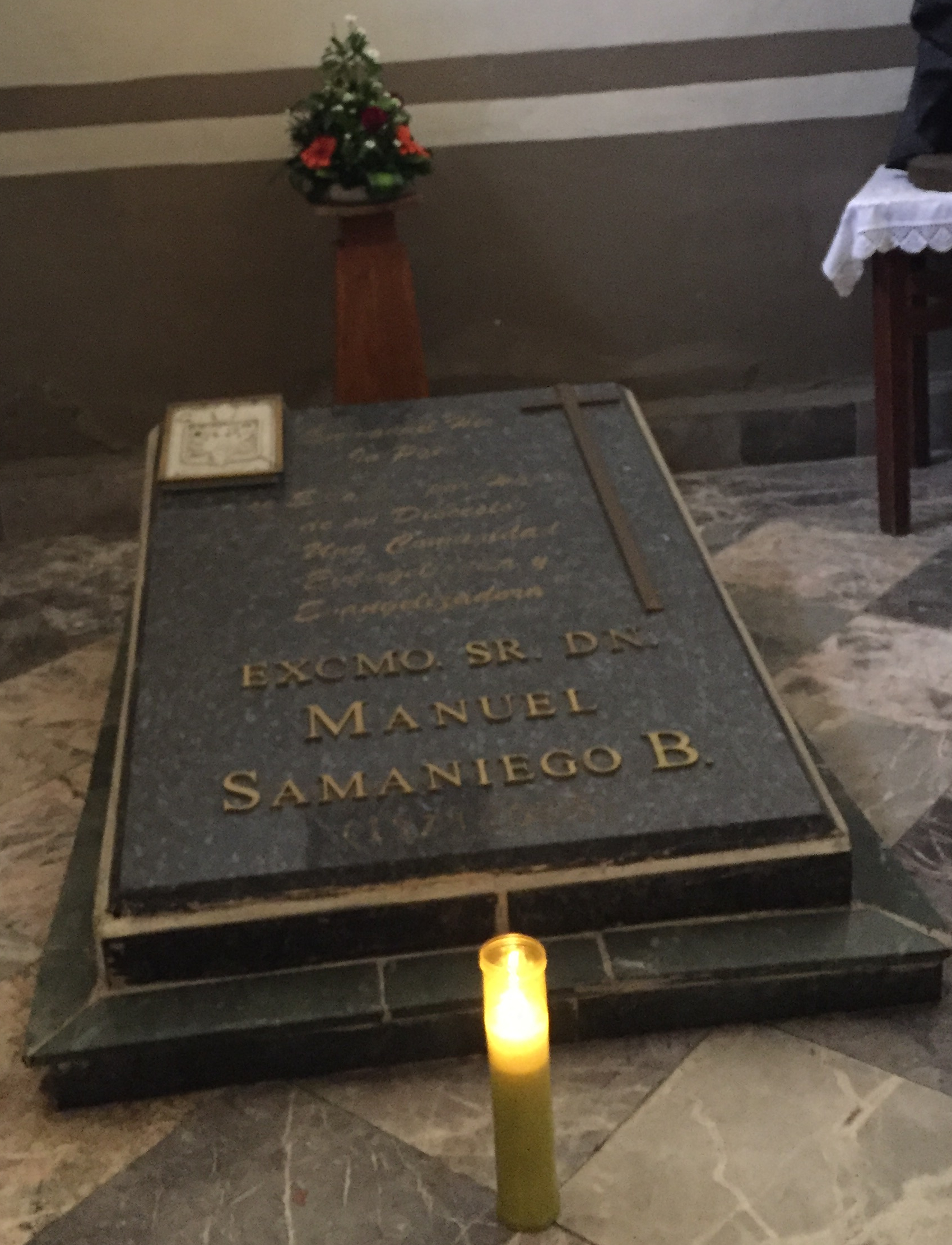
Grave of priest Manuel Samaniego Barriga inside the church
