= Teziutlán Cathedral =

Coordinates: 19.8175°N 97.3600°W

Our Lady of the Assumption Cathedral
- Catedral de Nuestra Señora de la Asunción
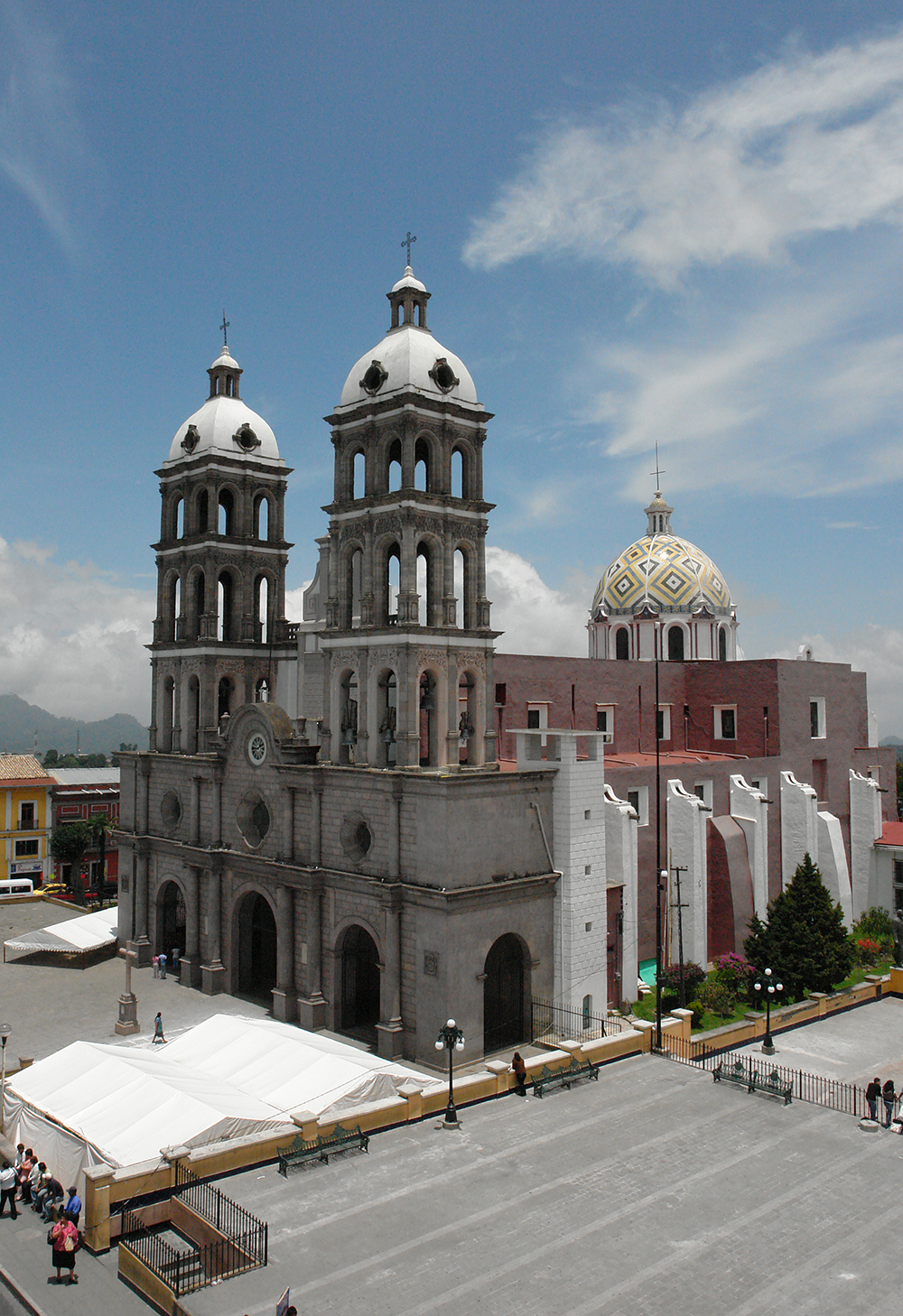
- Our Lady of the Assumption Cathedral
- Location: Teziutlán
- Country: Mexico
- Denomination: Roman Catholic Church

The Our Lady of the Assumption Cathedral (also Teziutlán Cathedral; Spanish: Catedral de Nuestra Señora de la Asunción) is a Catholic church located in the city of Teziutlán, Mexico. Formerly it was a hermitage dedicated to St. Michael the Archangel, and later became Chapel of the Rosary. On June 19, 1931, the parish was elevated to a cathedral, on the occasion of the change of episcopal seat passing from the city of Papantla to Teziutlán, leaving as the first bishop of the Diocese of Papantla the Hon. Mr. Nicolás Corona.

Its construction began in 1952, when 4388 pieces of stone of pink quarry of Xaltipan were worked for its facade, and was concluded April 30, 1954. The largest bell, called Santa Maria de la Asunción, weighing four tons, was cast in 1941.

== See also ==
- Roman Catholicism in Mexico
- Our Lady of the Assumption

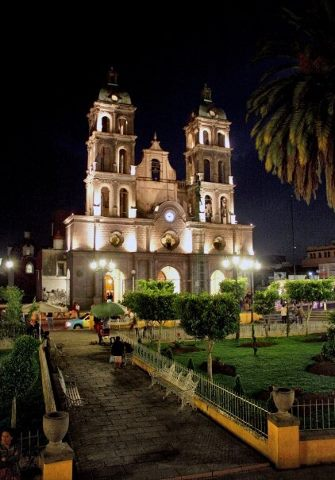
Another view
