= Guillermo Ortiz Mondragón =

Mexican Roman Catholic prelate (1947–2021)

- Bishop of Cuautitlán
- Church: Catholic Church
- Diocese: Diocese of Cuautitlán
- In office: 19 October 2005 – 14 September 2021
- Predecessor: Manuel Samaniego Barriga
- Successor: Efraín Mendoza Cruz
- Previous posts: Titular Bishop of Nova Barbara (2000-2005); Auxiliary Bishop of Mexico (2000-2005)

Orders
- Ordination: 5 June 1976
- Consecration: 4 March 2000 by Norberto Rivera Carrera

Personal details
- Born: Guillermo Rodrigo Teodoro Ortiz Mondragón; March 13, 1947 Toluca, State of Mexico, Mexico
- Died: September 14, 2021 (aged 74)

Guillermo Rodrigo Teodoro Ortiz Mondragón (March 13, 1947 – September 14, 2021) was a Mexican Roman Catholic prelate. He served as the Bishop of the Roman Catholic Diocese of Cuautitlán from October 2005 until his death in September 2021.

Ortiz was born on March 13, 1947, in Toluca, State of Mexico. He was ordained a deacon on December 15, 1974, and a Catholic priest on June 6, 1976. Ortiz was appointed an auxiliary bishop of the Roman Catholic Archdiocese of Mexico in January 2000.

In November 2000, Ortiz was elected President of the Episcopal Conference of Mexico. He also served as the official spokesperson for Pope John Paul II's fifth visit to Mexico in July and August 2002.

Ortiz was appointed Bishop of the Roman Catholic Diocese of Cuautitlán by Pope Benedict XVI on October 19, 2005. He was ordained on November 23, 2005, and held the position until his death in September 2021.

Bishop Guillermo Ortiz Mondragón died on September 14, 2021, at the age of 74.
