= St. Mark's Cathedral, Tuxtla Gutiérrez =

Coordinates: 16.7533°N 93.1158°W

St. Mark's Cathedral
- Catedral de San Marcos
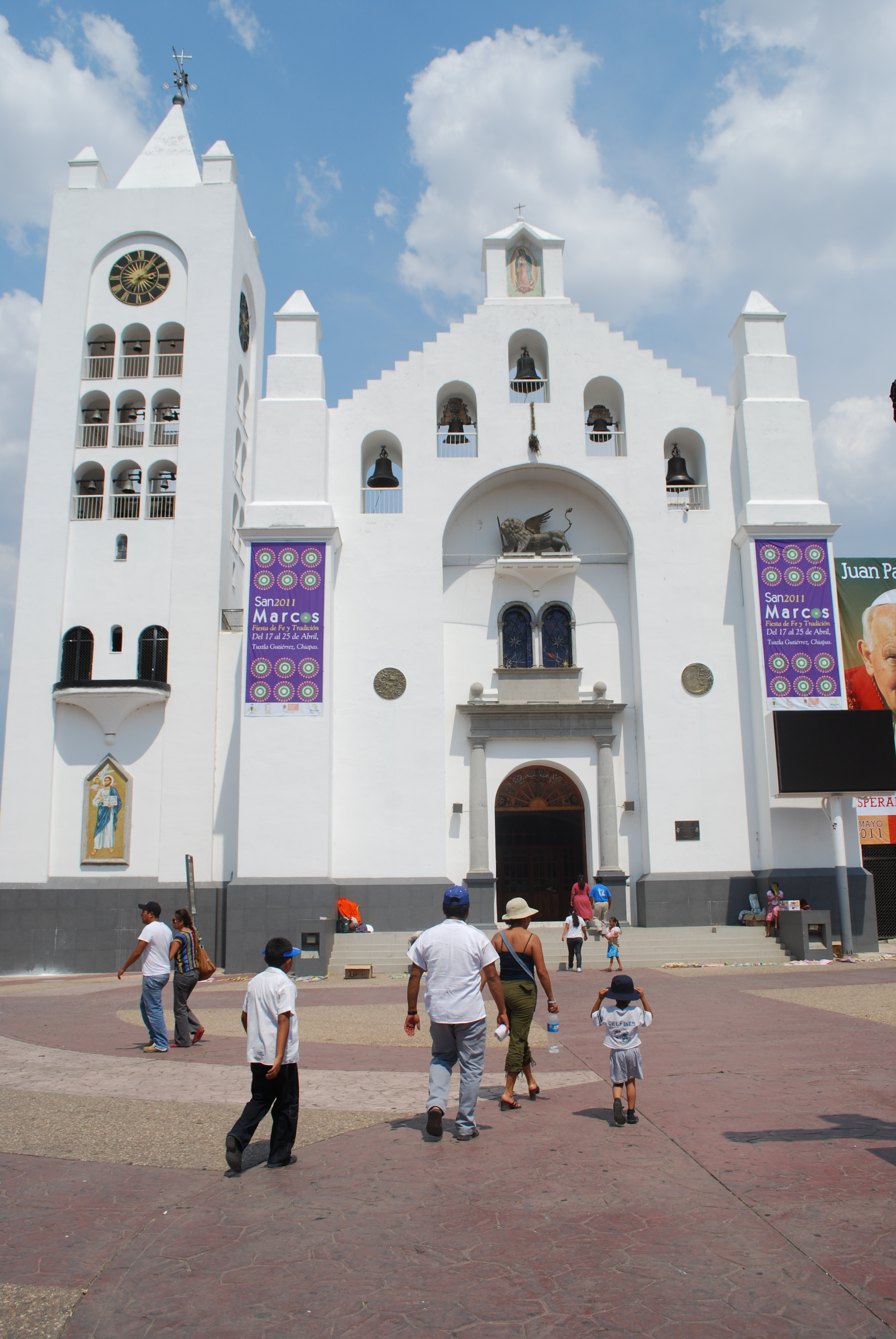
- St. Mark's Cathedral
- Location: Tuxtla Gutiérrez
- Country: Mexico
- Denomination: Roman Catholic Church

St. Mark's Cathedral (Spanish: Catedral de San Marcos), or also known as Tuxtla Gutiérrez Cathedral, is a Catholic church in Tuxtla Gutierrez, Chiapas, Mexico, and seat of the Roman Catholic Archdiocese of Tuxtla.

It formerly served as church for a Dominican priory, and has been remodeled several times. The building as of 2016 was completed in 1965 when Pope Paul VI created the Diocese of Tuxtla.

The patronage of Saint Mark, patron saint of Tuxtla, dates from 1560, when Dominican friars of the convent in Tecpatán constructed the first Catholic church for this population and dedicated it to San Marcos Evangelista.

== Bells ==
The tower contains a carillon of 48 bells cast in 1981 by the Dutch bellfoundry Petit & Fritsen. It rings automatically every hour to accompany a mechanical procession of the 12 Apostles, on the front of the tower below the belfry.

Five other bells, not connected to the carillon, are in openings in the center of the façade.

== See also ==
- Catholic Church in Mexico

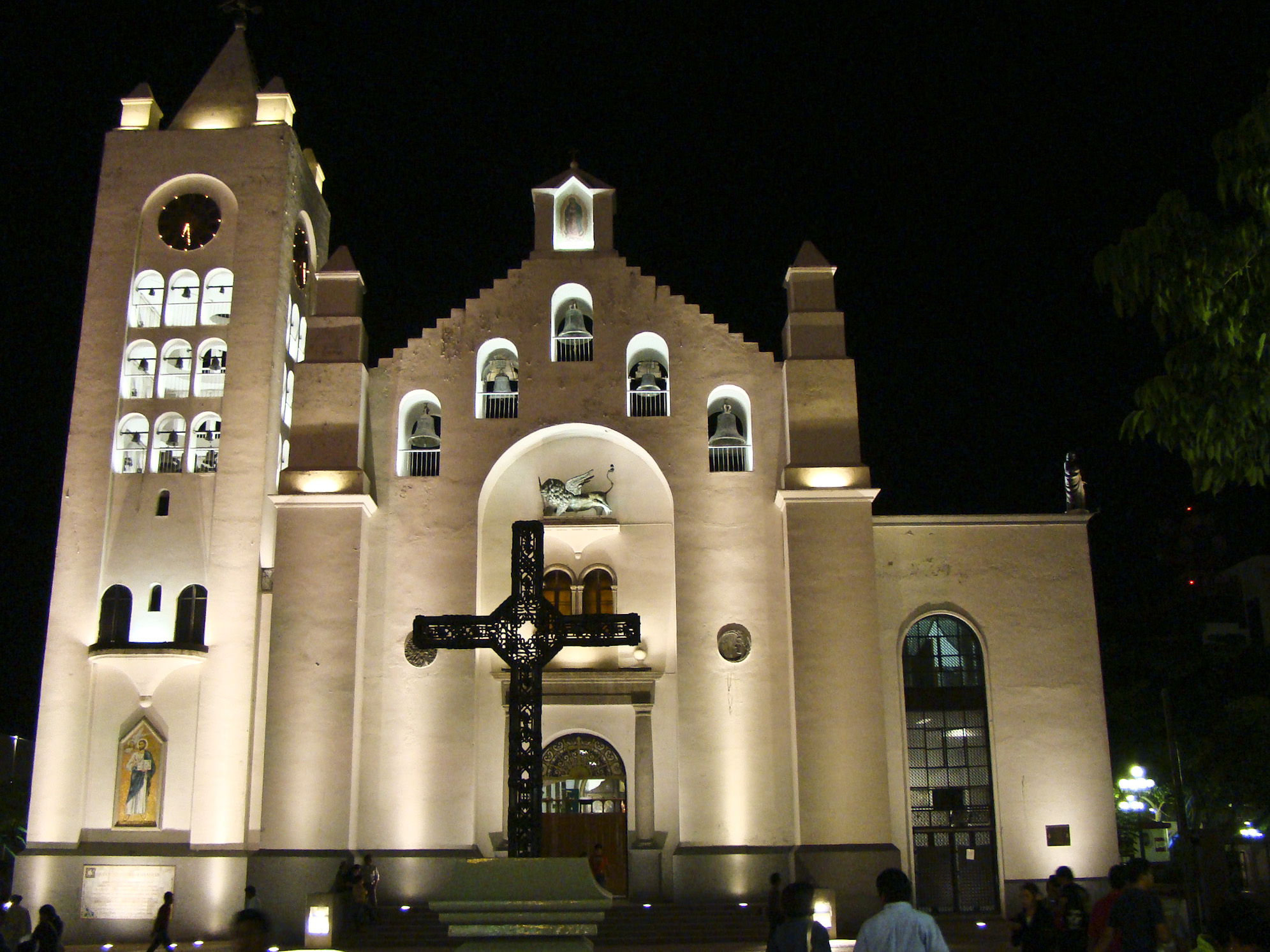
Another View
