= Saltillo Cathedral =

Coordinates: 25.4217°N 101.0000°W

St. James Cathedral
- Catedral de Santiago
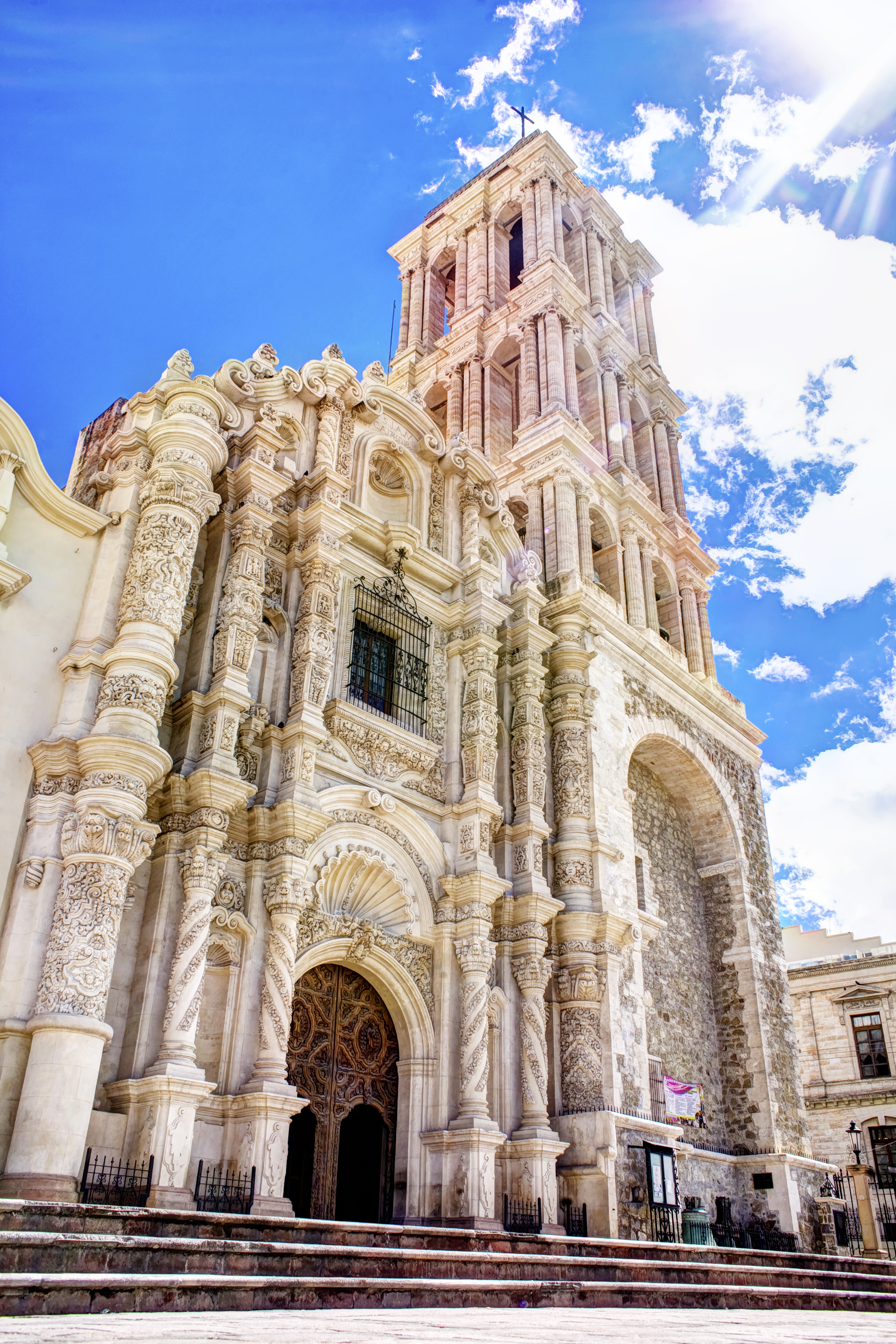
- St. James Cathedral
- Location: Saltillo
- Country: Mexico
- Denomination: Roman Catholic Church

The St. James Cathedral (Spanish: Catedral de Santiago) Also Saltillo Cathedral Is the catholic cathedral of the city of Saltillo in Mexico. It is the tallest cathedral in the north of Mexico, and the 2nd tallest in the country with a height of 81m. The cathedral is located in the historical center of the city, opposite the Plaza de Armas, is one of the architectural jewels of the state of Coahuila.

Raised to the side of the original parish, in the year 1745, by the priest Felipe Suárez de Estrada, under the project of Nicolás Hernández, the new temple of greater proportions was not finished until 1800. With the erection of the Diocese of Saltillo on June 23, 1891, by a bull created by Pope Leo XIII, the temple is designated as the site of this, and is granted the rank of cathedral. The tower began in the year 1883. Later as it was called chapel step to the cathedral name in the year 1951.

== See also ==
- Roman Catholicism in Mexico

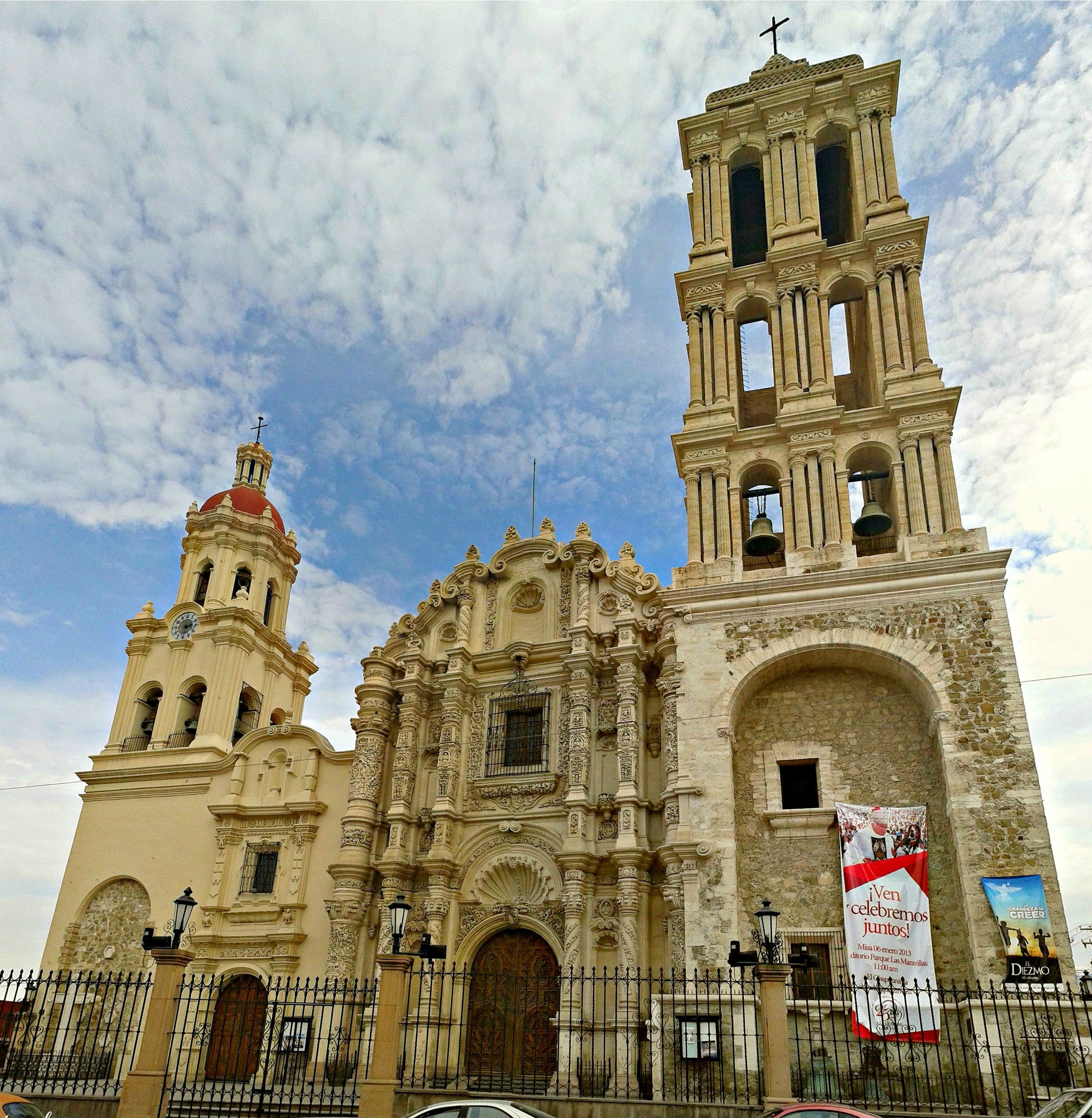
Facade
