= Mirador del Obispado =

Hill and lookout in Monterrey, Mexico

Coordinates: 25°40′34.68″N 100°20′45.86″W

Bishop's Outlook
- Mirador del Obispado
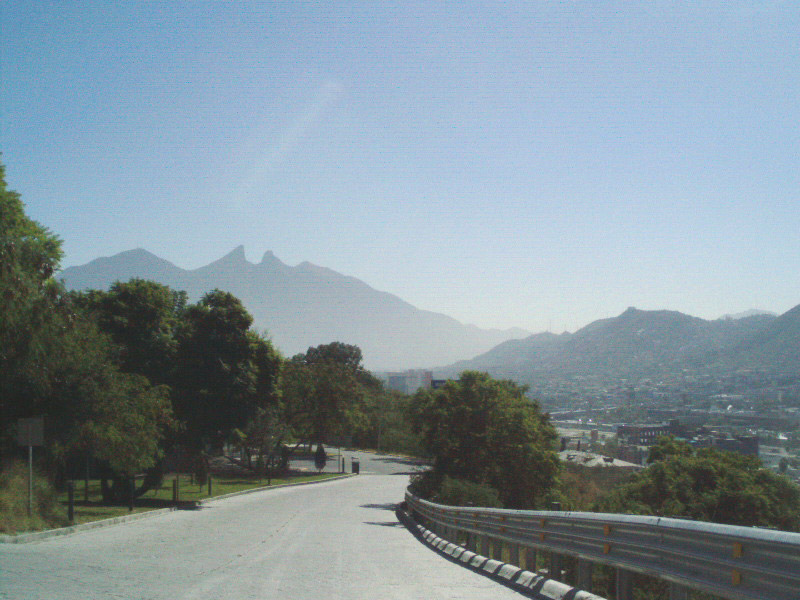
- View of the city from the walking path
- Interactive map of Bishop's Outlook
- Location: Cerro del Obispado, Monterrey, Nuevo Leon, Mexico
- Type: Landmark (bandera monumental)
- Width: 40 metres (130 ft)
- Height: 100.6 metres (330 ft) (flagpole)
- Dedicated date: February 24, 2005 (flag)
- Flag dimensions: 50 by 28.6 metres (164 ft × 94 ft)

The Mirador del Obispado (Bishop's Lookout) is located at the top of the Cerro del Obispado (Bishop's Hill) in the city of Monterrey, in Mexican state Nuevo Leon. It features the biggest bandera monumental (monumental flag) in Mexico. The hill and the lookout receive their name from the building constructed in the middle of the hill by the end of the 18th century, the Palacio del Obispado (Bishop's Palace).

At an altitude of 775 meters above the sea level the lookout consists of a 40 meters of diameter round-shaped esplanade with the flag pole at its center. There are benches, a small parking lot (mainly for handicapped people) and 3 French gardens. The installations are also equipped with restrooms and drinking fountains. Since it was conceived as a family walking stroll, the main road is wide and well illuminated. Cars are allowed to pass but the main parking lot is at the entrance of the Park.

== The Bandera Monumental ==
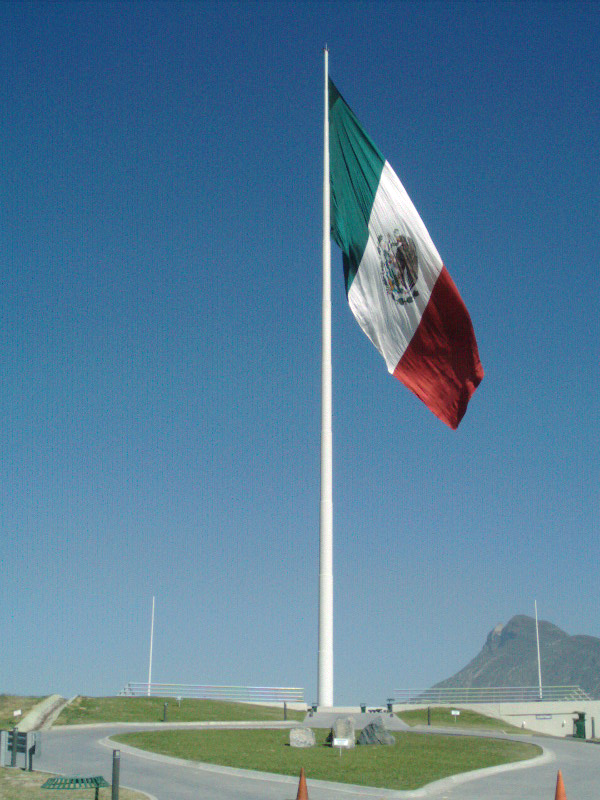
Second biggest bandera monumental in Mexico

The country's biggest monumental flag was located at the top of the Cerro del Obispado, in the same place the public scenic lookout is, and it was inaugurated on February 24, 2005 to celebrate the Mexican Flag Day. This flag is currently the second largest in the country, after the one located in Piedras Negras, Coahuila.

The pole weighs 120 metric tons (130 short tons) and is 100.6 metres (330 ft) tall. The flag itself measures 50 by 28.6 metres (164 by 94 ft) and weighs 230 kilograms (510 lb), which doubles the size of most monumental flags.

Some important days are celebrated with special ceremonies such as the Flag Day, the Independence Day and the Army Day; these ceremonies sometimes include lighting shows, fireworks, and artistic performances such as regional dances, musical festivals, and concerts.

== See also ==
- Palacio del Obispado
- Famous Places in Monterrey
