= Cerro del Obispado =

Landmark in Monterrey, Mexico

Coordinates: 25°40′34.25″N 100°20′45.99″W

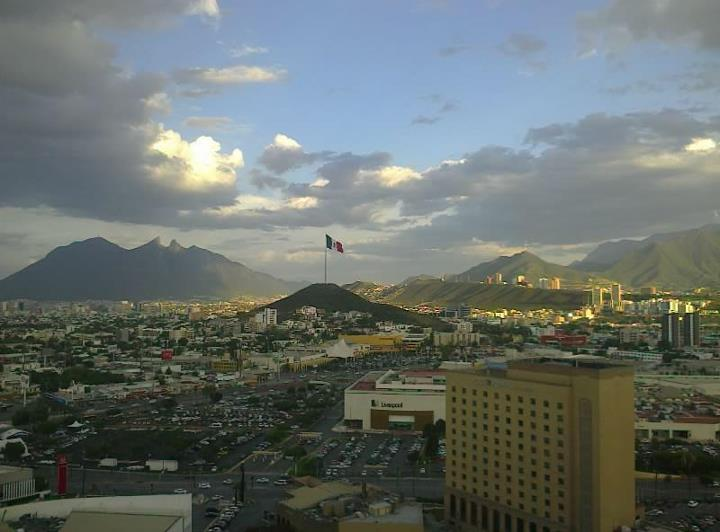
Cerro del Obispado

The Cerro del Obispado (Spanish for Bishopric Hill) is a famous landmark in the city of Monterrey, Mexico, named after the building constructed in the middle of the slope by the end of the 18th century.

The hill is a popular recreational area that includes a public lookout point (Mirador del Obispado), a monumental flag, and the famous Bishopric Palace (Palacio del Obispado).

== See also ==
- Mirador del Obispado
- Cerro de la Silla
