= Diocese of Ciudad Victoria =

Latin Catholic jurisdiction in Mexico

Coordinates: 23.7315°N 99.1508°W

Diocese of Ciudad Victoria Dioecesis Civitatis Victoriensis Diócesis de Ciudad Victoria

Location
- Country: Mexico
- Ecclesiastical province: Province of Monterrey

Statistics
- Area: 15,341 sq mi (39,730 km^{2})
- Population: Total; Catholics: (as of 2006); 463,762; 387,241 (83.5%)
- Parishes: 33

Information
- Denomination: Catholic Church
- Sui iuris church: Latin Church
- Rite: Roman Rite
- Established: 21 December 1964 (60 years ago)
- Cathedral: Cathedral of the Sacred Heart of Jesus

Current leadership
- Pope: Leo XIV
- Bishop: Oscar Efraín Tamez Villarreal
- Metropolitan Archbishop: Rogelio Cabrera López
- Bishops emeritus: Antonio González Sánchez

Website
- www.diocesisdevictoria.org

The Diocese of Ciudad Victoria (Latin: Dioecesis Civitatis Victoriensis) is a Latin Church ecclesiastical territory or diocese of the Catholic Church in Mexico. It is a suffragan in the ecclesiastical province of the metropolitan Archdiocese of Monterrey. The diocese was erected on 21 December 1964. from territory split from the Diocese of Tampico (that had the name of Diocese of Ciudad Victoria between 1870 and 1958).

== Ordinaries ==
- José de Jesús Tirado Pedraza (1965-1973)
- Alfonso de Jesús Hinojosa Berrones (1974-1985)
- Raymundo López Mateos, O.F.M. (1985-1994)
- Antonio González Sánchez (1995-2021)
- Oscar Efraín Tamez Villarreal (2021-present)

== Episcopal See ==
- Ciudad Victoria, Tamaulipas
