= Alfonso de Jesús Hinojosa Berrones =

Mexican Roman Catholic bishop

- Bishop of Ciudad Victoria
- Church: Catholic Church
- Diocese: Diocese of Ciudad Victoria
- In office: 12 February 1974 – 10 April 1985
- Predecessor: José de Jesús Tirado y Pedraza
- Successor: Raymundo López Mateos
- Other post: Auxiliary Bishop of Monterrey (1985-2000)

Orders
- Ordination: 9 October 1949 by Guillermo Tritschler y Córdova
- Consecration: 5 April 1974 by Alfonso Espino y Silva

Personal details
- Born: 7 October 1924 Monterrey, Nuevo León, Mexico
- Died: 23 February 2017 (aged 92)

Alfonso de Jesús Hinojosa Berrones (7 October 1924 – 23 February 2017) was a Catholic bishop.

Ordained to the priesthood in 1949, Hinojosa Berrones served as bishop of the Diocese of Ciudad Victoria, Mexico, from 1974 to 1985. He then served as auxiliary bishop of the Roman Catholic Archdiocese of Monterey from 1985 to 2000.
