= Archdiocese of Monterrey =

Latin Catholic jurisdiction in Mexico

Coordinates: 25.6656°N 100.3100°W

Archdiocese of Monterrey Archidioecesis Monterreyensis Arquidiócesis de Monterrey
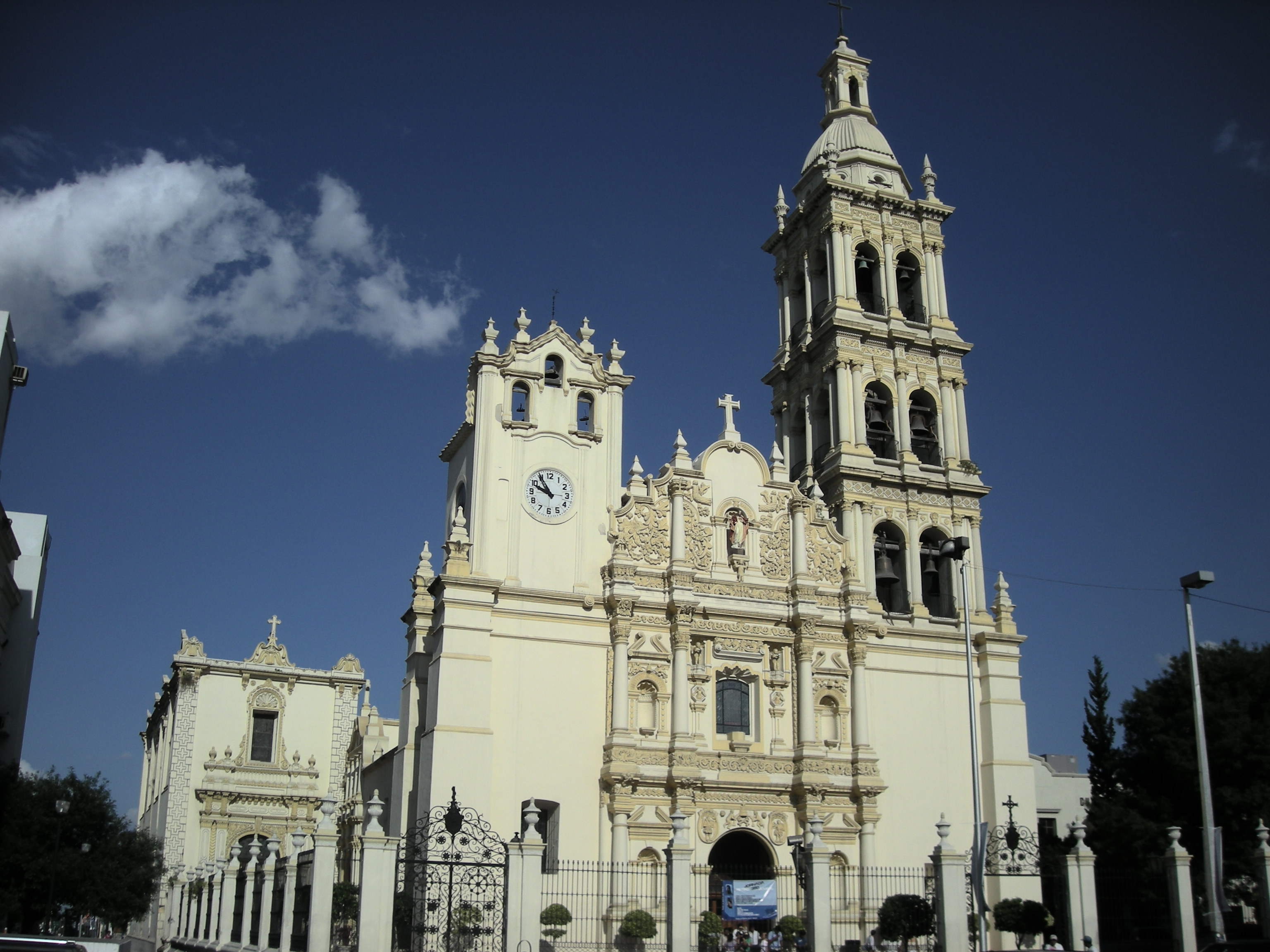
- Catedral Metropolitana de Monterrey

Location
- Country: Mexico

Statistics
- Area: 17,866 km^{2} (6,898 sq mi)
- Population: Total; Catholics: (as of 2008); 6,809,345; 5,146,211 (75.5%)

Information
- Denomination: Catholic Church
- Sui iuris church: Latin Church
- Rite: Roman Rite
- Cathedral: Catedral Metropolitana de Nuestra Señora de Monterrey (Metropolitan Cathedral of Our Lady of Monterrey)

Current leadership
- Pope: Leo XIV
- Archbishop: Rogelio Cabrera López
- Auxiliary Bishops: Juan Armando Pérez Talamantes; José Manuel Garza Madero; César Garza Miranda; José Eugenio Ramos Delgado
- Bishops emeritus: José Lizares Estrada

Map

The Archdiocese of Monterrey (Latin: Archidioecesis Monterreyensis) is a Latin Church ecclesiastical territory or archdiocese of the Catholic Church located in Monterrey, Nuevo León, Mexico.

The Archdiocese of Monterrey is a metropolitan see; its suffragan dioceses are the Ciudad Victoria, Linares, Matamoros-Reynosa, Nuevo Laredo, Piedras Negras, Saltillo and Tampico.

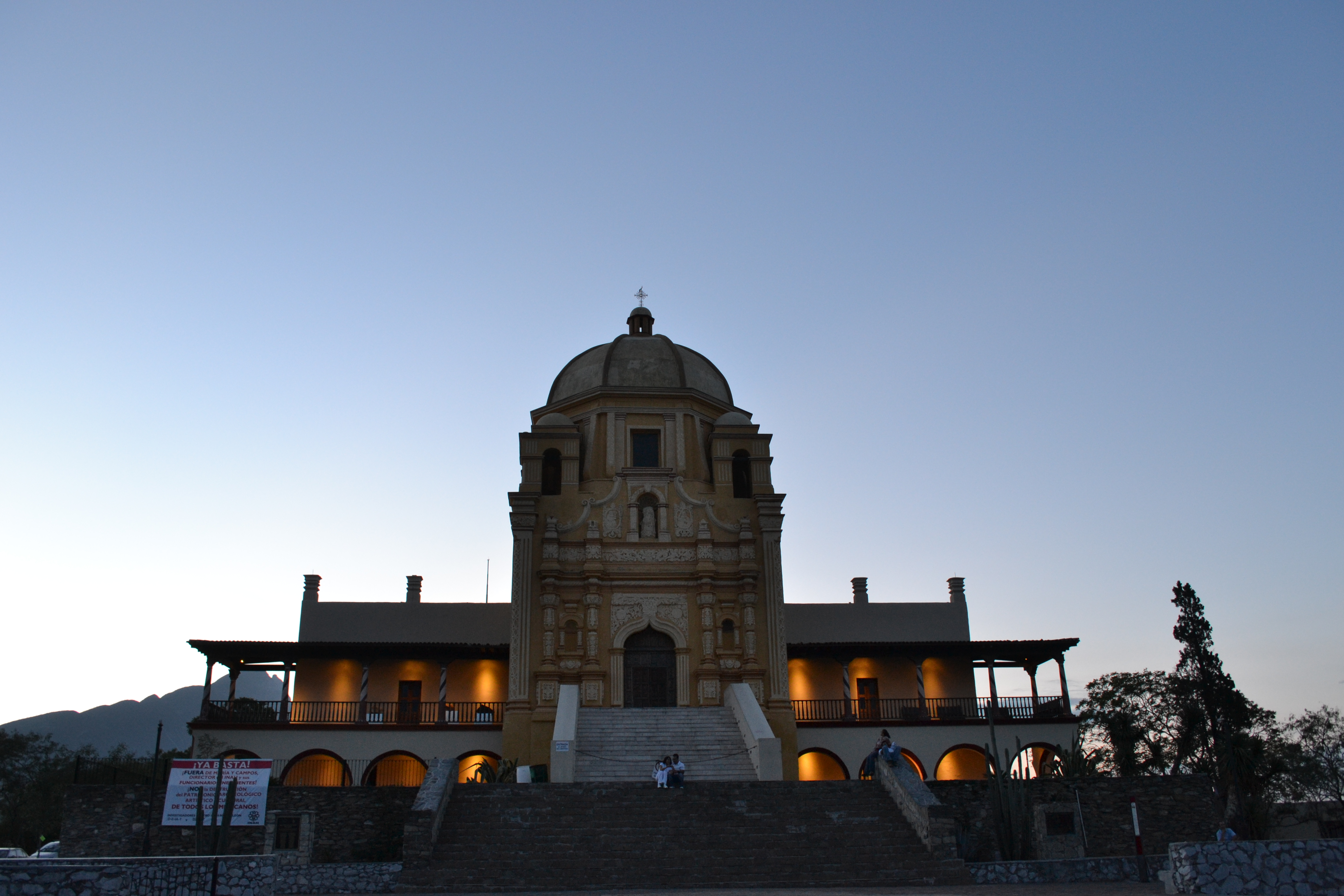
Palacio del Obispado was the archdiocese seat

== History ==
The Diocese of Linares or Nuevo Leon (but with the see in Monterrey) was erected by Papal Bull Relata Semper by Pope Pius VI on December 15, 1777. The diocese's territory was taken from the Dioceses of Mexico, Michoacan and, mainly, Guadalajara. It encompassed the modern states of Nuevo Leon, Coahuila, Tamaulipas and Texas. It was first called "Diocese of Linares" (not to be confused with the current Diocese of Linares), then Linares-Monterrey. In 1891 it became a Metropolitan Archdiocese. Its name was changed to Monterrey on June 9, 1922.

== Bishops ==
=== Ordinaries ===
1. Juan Antonio de Jesús Sacedón Sánchez † (1778–1779)
2. Rafael José Verger y Suau (1782–1790)
3. Andrés Ambrosio de Llanos y Valdés (1791–1799)
4. Primo Feliciano Marín y Porras (1801–1815)
5. José Ignacio de Arancibia y Hormaguei (1817–1821)
6. José María de Jesús Belaunzarán y Ureña (1831–1838)
7. Salvador de Apodaca y Loreto (1842–1844)
8. Jose Ignacio Sánchez Navarro (1851–1852)
9. Francisco de Paula Verea y González (1853–1879) named Bishop of Tlaxcala
10. José María Ignacio Montes de Oca y Obregón (1879–1884) named Bishop of San Luis Potosí
11. Blasius Enciso (1884–1885)
12. Jacinto López y Romo (1886–1895) named Archbishop of Guadalajara
13. Santiago de los Santos Garza Zambrano (1895–1907)
14. Leopoldo Ruiz y Flóres (1907–1911) named Archbishop of Michoacán
15. Francisco Plancarte y Navarrete (1912–1920)
16. José Juan de Jesús Herrera y Piña (1921–1927)
17. José Guadalupe Ortíz y López (1929–1940)
18. Guillermo Tritschler y Córdova (1941–1952)
19. Alfonso Espino y Silva (1952–1976)
20. José de Jesús Tirado Pedraza (1976–1983)
21. Adolfo Suárez Rivera (1983–2003) elevated to Cardinal in 1994
22. Francisco Robles Ortega (2003–2011) named Archbishop of Guadalajara; elevated to Cardinal in 2007
23. Rogelio Cabrera López (2012–present)

=== Coadjutor bishop ===
- Alfonso Espino y Silva (1951–1952)

=== Auxiliary bishops ===
- José Guadalupe Ortíz y López (1926–1929), appointed Archbishop here
- José de Jesús Tirado Pedraza (1973–1976), appointed Archbishop here
- Luis Reynoso Cervantes (1978–1982), appointed Bishop of Ciudad Obregón, Sonora
- Alfonso de Jesús Hinojosa Berrones (1985–2000)
- José Lizares Estrada (1987–2009)
- Gustavo Rodríguez Vega (2001–2008), appointed Bishop of Nuevo Laredo, Tamaulipas
- Alfonso Cortés Contreras (2005–2009), appointed Bishop of Cuernavaca, Morelos
- Jorge Alberto Cavazos Arizpe (2009–2012), appointed Apostolic Administrator of Nuevo Laredo, Tamaulipas
- Alfonso Gerardo Miranda Guardiola (2014–2024), appointed Bishop of Piedras Negras
- Juan Armando Pérez Talamantes (2014–present)
- Heriberto Cavazos Pérez (2016–2023), retired
- Oscar Efraín Tamez Villarreal (2016–2021), appointed Bishop of Ciudad Victoria, Tamaulipas
- Juan Carlos Arcq Guzmán (2020–2024), appointed Bishop of Tacámbaro, Michoacán
- José Manuel Garza Madero (2020–present)
- César Garza Miranda (2020–present)
- José Eugenio Ramos Delgado (2025–present)

=== Other priests of this diocese who became bishops ===
- José Guadalupe Galván Galindo, appointed Bishop of Ciudad Valles, San Luís Potosí in 1994
- Miguel Angel Alba Díaz, appointed Auxiliary Bishop of Antequera, Oaxaca in 1995
- Eduardo Porfirio Patiño Leal, appointed Bishop of Córdoba, Veracruz in 2000
- Alonso Gerardo Garza Treviño, appointed Bishop of Piedras Negras, Coahuila in 2003
- Ruy Rendón Leal, appointed Prelate of El Salto, Durango in 2005
- Hilario González García, appointed Bishop of Linares, Nuevo León in 2014

== See also ==
- List of Roman Catholic archdioceses in México
