= Ciudad Victoria Cathedral =

Sacred Heart of Jesus Cathedral
- Catedral del Sagrado Corazón de Jesús
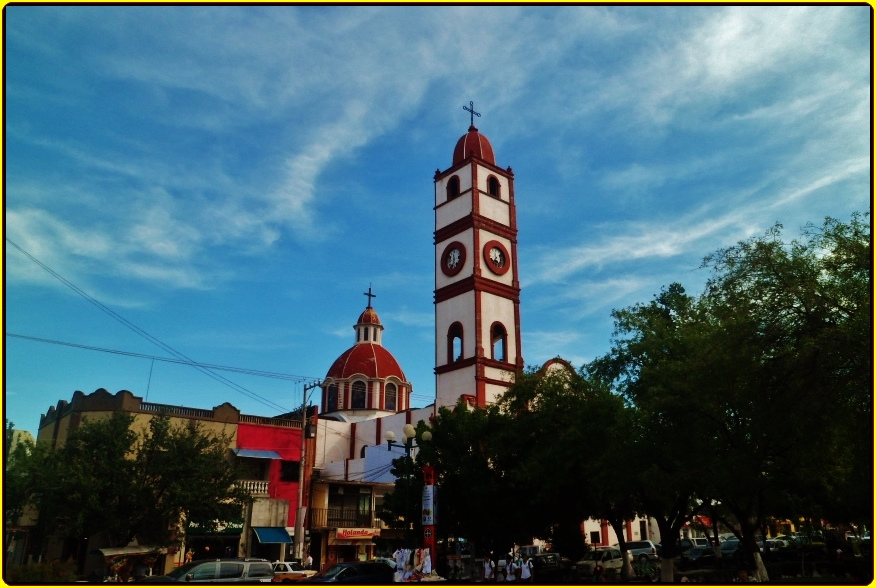
- Sacred Heart of Jesus Cathedral
- 23°43′53.5″N 99°9′2.5″W
- Location: Ciudad Victoria
- Country: Mexico
- Denomination: Roman Catholic Church

The Sacred Heart of Jesus Cathedral (Spanish: Catedral del Sagrado Corazón de Jesús) Also Ciudad Victoria Cathedral Is the second building that has served as the main church of the Roman Catholic Diocese of Ciudad Victoria in Mexico. It was designated as cathedral headquarters in 1962, to replace the then Cathedral of Our Lady of Refuge (cathedral after 1870), whose temple presently boasts the rank of basilica, granted by Pope John Paul II.

The current building is quite simple. The main front is two bodies, very austere, The main arch is half a point. The second body presents the choir window. It has a tower of three bodies, with dome crowned by an iron cross. The second body of the tower houses a clock.

The plant of the temple, of Latin cross, consists of three bodies. On the cruise, the dome rises, octagonally, with lint.

The interior is very austere, the Corinthian-style striated columns stand out, and features a regular-quality neoclassical altar in wood, persuaded by the image of the Sacred Heart of Jesus

== See also ==
- Roman Catholicism in Mexico
- Sacred Heart of Jesus
