= José Lizares Estrada =

Mexican Roman Catholic bishop (born 1934)

The Most Reverend José Lizares Estrada
- Auxiliary Bishop Emeritus of Monterrey
- Church: Catholic Church
- Archdiocese: Monterrey
- Appointed: 25 March 1987
- In office: 1987–2009

Orders
- Ordination: 19 December 1959
- Consecration: 29 April 1980 by Girolamo Prigione

Personal details
- Born: 31 May 1934 (age 92) Tapalpa, Jalisco, Mexico
- Education: Major Seminary of Guadalajara

José Lizares Estrada (born 31 May 1934) is a Mexican Roman Catholic prelate who served as the Bishop of Ciudad Altamirano from 1980 to 1987 and as an auxiliary bishop of the Archdiocese of Monterrey from 1987 until his retirement in 2009. He was appointed bishop by Pope John Paul II and was ordained to the priesthood in 1959.

== Biography ==
=== Early life and priesthood ===
Lizares Estrada was born on 31 May 1934 in Tapalpa, in the Mexican state of Jalisco. He studied humanities, philosophy and theology at the Seminary of Guadalajara. He was ordained a priest on 19 December 1959.

Following his ordination, he served in several pastoral positions in Jalisco. He worked as a cooperating vicar in the parishes of Tala, Apozol and San Julián, and as a resident vicar in San Luis Soyatlán, El Refugio and Atotonilco el Bajo. After the establishment of the Diocese of Ciudad Guzmán, he served there as a notary of the ecclesiastical tribunal, head of the lay apostolate and vicar general.

=== Episcopal ministry ===
On 4 March 1980, Pope John Paul II appointed Lizares Estrada Bishop of Ciudad Altamirano. He received episcopal consecration on 29 April 1980. He served as Bishop of Ciudad Altamirano 31 January 1987, when he resigned and lately was appointed auxiliary bishop of the Archdiocese of Monterrey.

=== Auxiliary Bishop of Monterrey ===
On 25 March 1987, Lizares Estrada began serving as auxiliary bishop of the Archdiocese of Monterrey, where he also served as vicar general. During his ministry in Monterrey, he was involved in the formation and continuing education of priests in the archdiocese's deaneries and pastoral zones. He prepared a manual for deans and episcopal vicars and helped establish the Diaconal Institute and its formation programme. He also founded the Institute of Distance Theology in Monterrey.

He worked to develop the Archdiocesan Commission for the Laity and served as Episcopal Vicar for Pastoral Affairs and Episcopal Vicar for the Laity, the latter position for approximately twenty years. He also contributed to the preparation of the parish directory and the development of various diocesan pastoral structures.

On 21 December 2009, Pope Benedict XVI accepted his resignation from the office of auxiliary bishop of Monterrey, in accordance with canons 411 and 401 §1 of the Code of Canon Law.

In November 2019, the Archdiocese of Monterrey commemorated his approaching 60th anniversary of priestly ordination, which fell on 19 December of that year.
