= Palacio del Obispado =

Coordinates: 25°40′24.50″N 100°20′31.84″W

Regional Museum of Nuevo León
- Museo Regional de Nuevo León
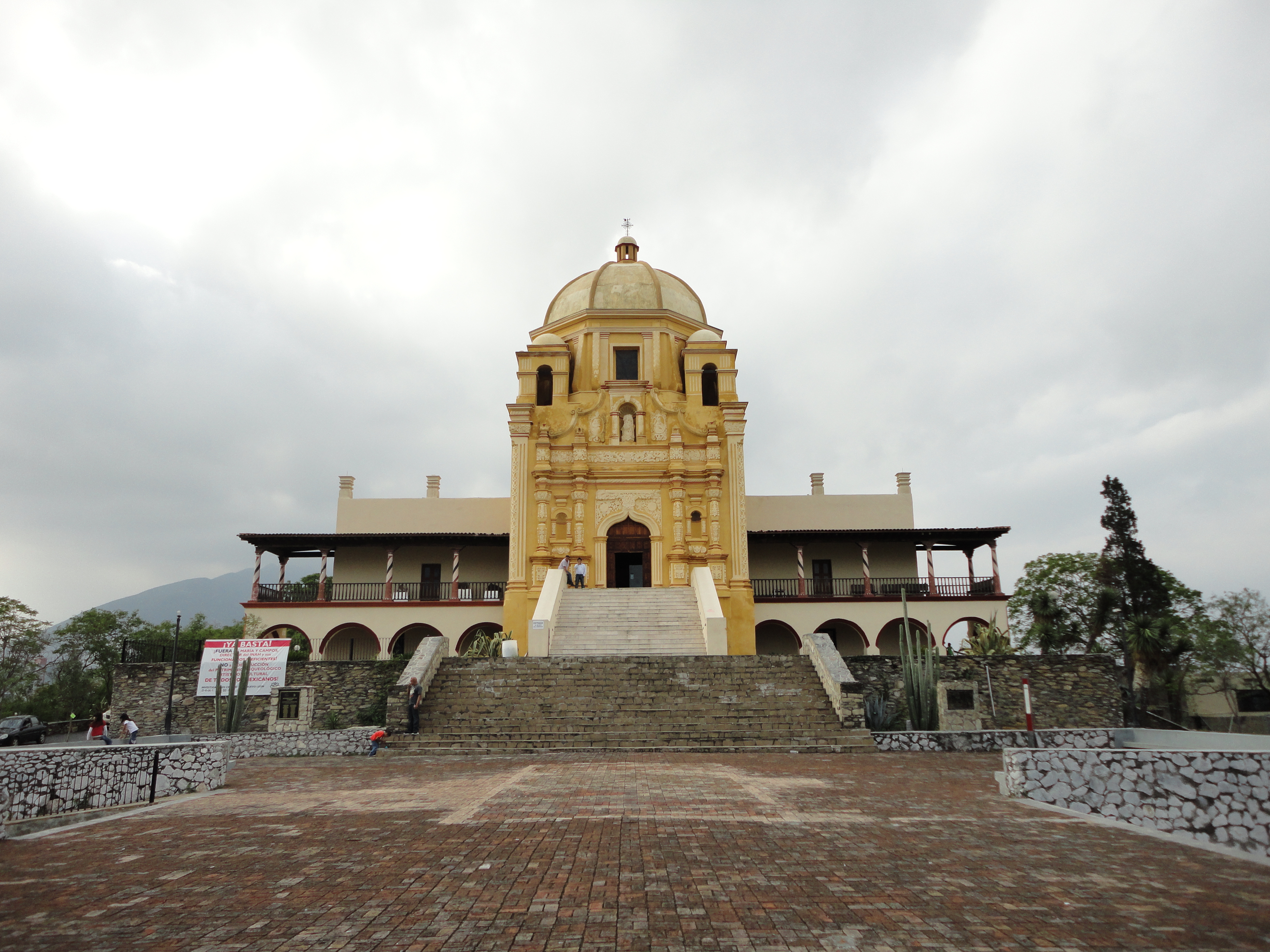

- Location within Nuevo León
- Former name: Palacio del Obispado
- Established: September 20, 1956
- Location: Monterrey, Nuevo Leon, MX
- Type: History Museum
- Website: https://www.cultura.gob.mx/estados/turismo-cultural-detalle.php?id=66046

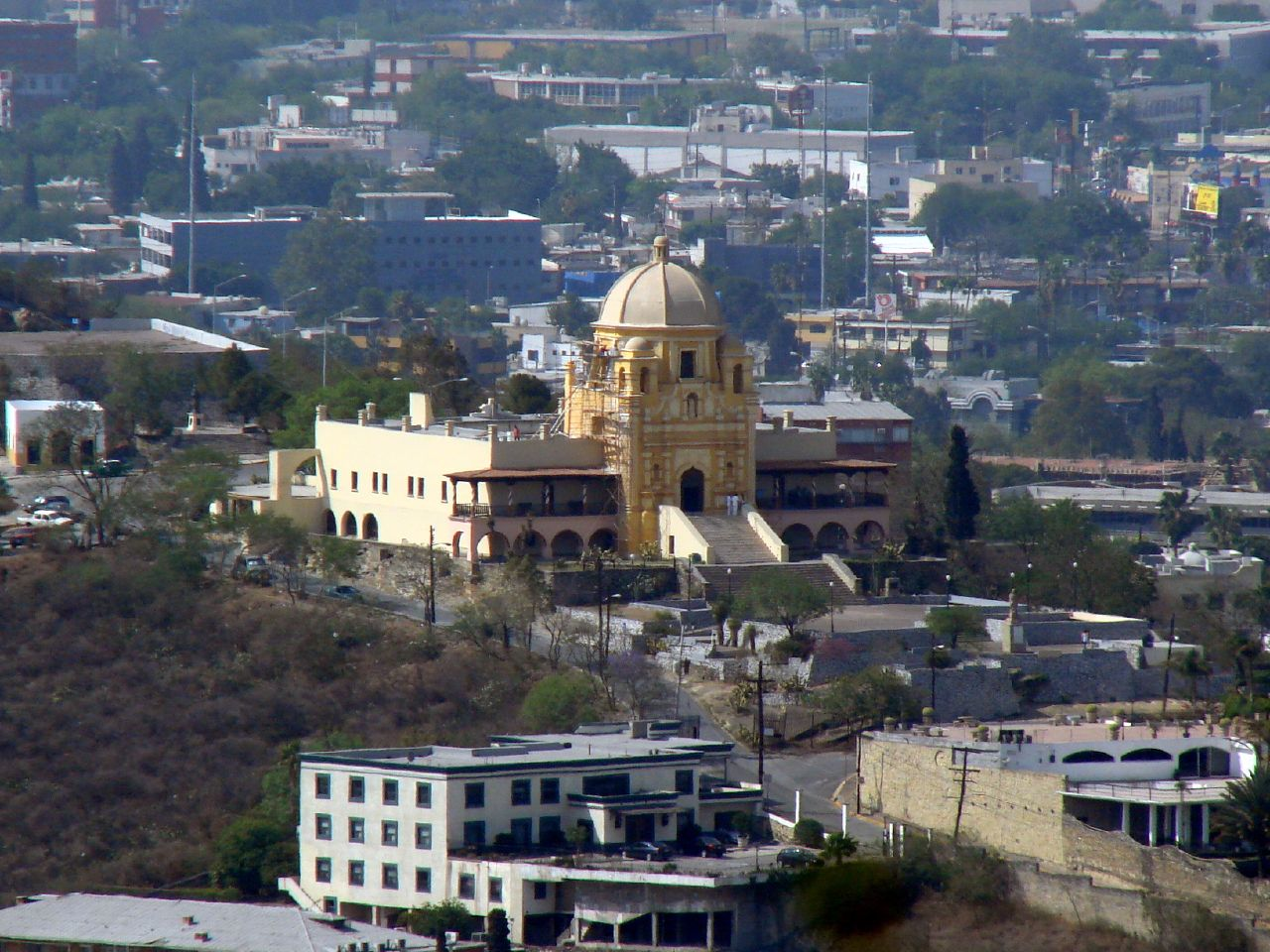
Palacio del Obispado on Cerro del Obispado in Monterrey

The Palacio del Obispado, Spanish for Bishop's Palace, also known as El Obispado or the Bishop's Museum, originally called Palacio de Nuestra Señora de Guadalupe, is an 18th-century colonial building, located in Monterrey, Nuevo León state, Northeastern Mexico. It was constructed between 1787 and 1788 due to the initiative of Rafael José Verger, the second bishop of the Linares Diocese.

It is located on the top of the Chepa Verde hill, which got its name due to it being surrounded by the lands of José Vera. The Palace was constructed on the slopes of the hill, now named Cerro del Obispado (Bishop Hill) after its principal building.

The building has also served as a military fortress and a public walkway. Since September 20th, 1956, it has hosted the Regional Museum of Leon.

== History ==
During the reign of Charles III of Spain and through a bull issued by Pope Pious VI in 1777, the Diocese of Linares was erected for the town of the same name but soon the city of Monterrey became the seat of the new diocese (it's the current Archdiocese of Monterrey).

At the request of the king, the Pope named the palace the diocese of Antonio de Jesús Sacedón, who received his assignment in 1779 through a representative who took possession of the building with all its rites. He died before arriving at Linares and the Pope named Rafael José Verger as his successor.

As soon as he received his assignment, he requested that the Pope move the Bishop's capital to Monterrey, the only population he deemed worthy of it.

== Construction and Restoration ==
The property was constructed at the end of the Viceroyalty at the request of the Franciscan Friar Rafael José Verger, who promoted the construction of a House of Repose and Worship on lands that were conceded by the city hall of Monterey in 1787.

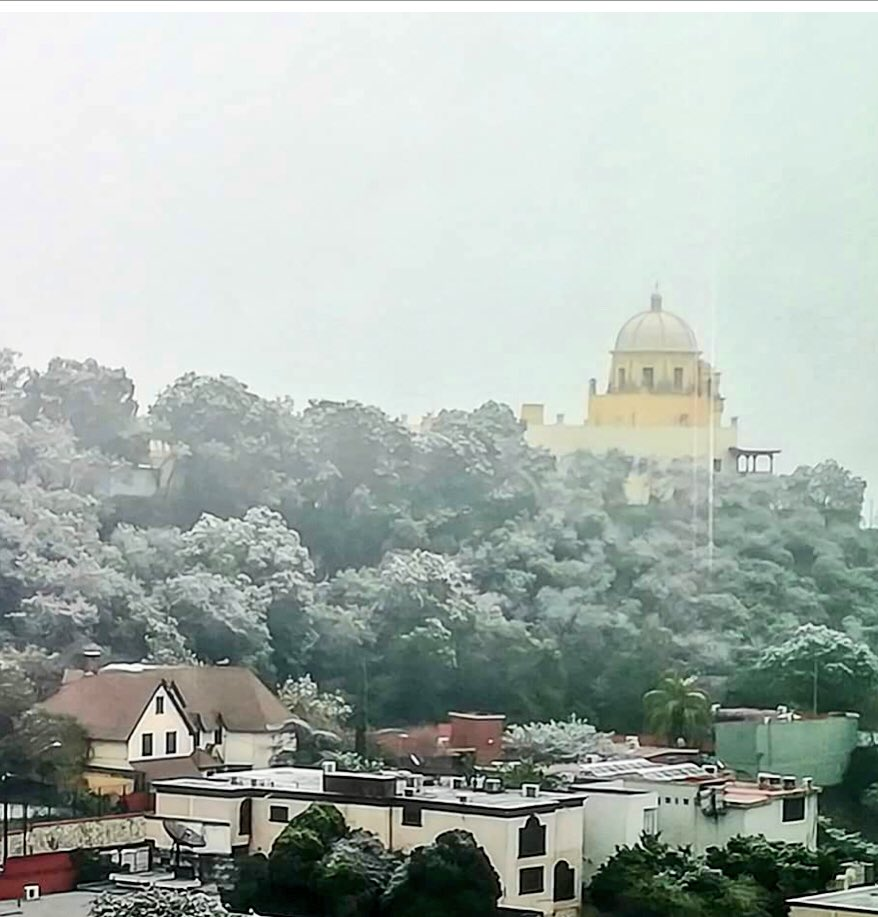
Museum of Palacio del Obispado in snow.

After the death of Friar Rafael José Verger and Mexico's independence, the palace has been used as a military fortress, having a prominent role in the defense of the city during the battle of Monterrey in the Mexican-American War (1846), the Second French intervention in Mexico (1864), the Plan de la Noria (1871), and the Mexican Revolution (1913 & 1914).

Towards the end of the 19th century, an agreement was signed between the Federal Government of Mexico and the State of Nuevo León in which the Federal Government remained in possession of the building, but passed approximately 30 hectares of surrounding lands of the hill and its slopes into State possession.

The palace, however, suffered some damages and modifications and spent decades abandoned and in ruin, being used as a lazaretto during the epidemics of 1893 and 1903, and as a cabaret in 1920.

This structure, now commonly known as the Obispado, has a large historical and architectural value. The first restoration was started in 1946 and ten years later, in 1956, it was incorporated as a museum. Until 1998, they recovered the corridors of the main building and decorated the interior of the oratory dome.

== Architecture ==
The Bishop's Palace was built in the Spanish colonial Baroque style. The domed tower has a carved stone facade.

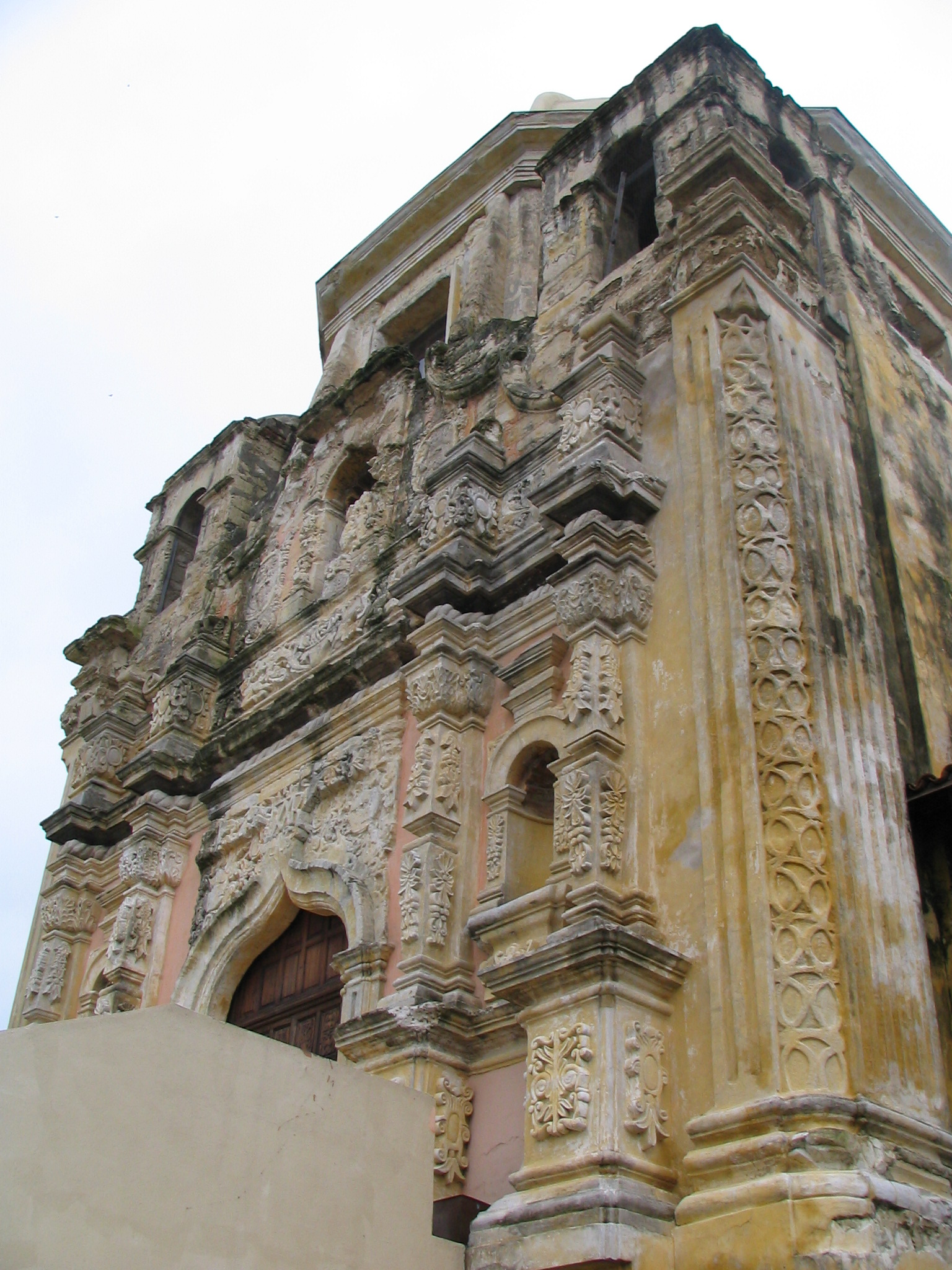
Baroque style stone facade of the tower

It is one of the city's oldest buildings, completed by the end of the 18th century.

The palace is distinguished by its large size, as well as the solidity and height of its walls. The size of its main facade in its Baroque style and its stipe (inverted copyramidal column or pillar) highlights the grandeur of its dome, completed in 1853 and 1857.

The building is built of ashlar stone, a characteristic material of the region, and is one of the few examples of viceregal architecture that are still preserved in northeastern Mexico.

== Gallery ==
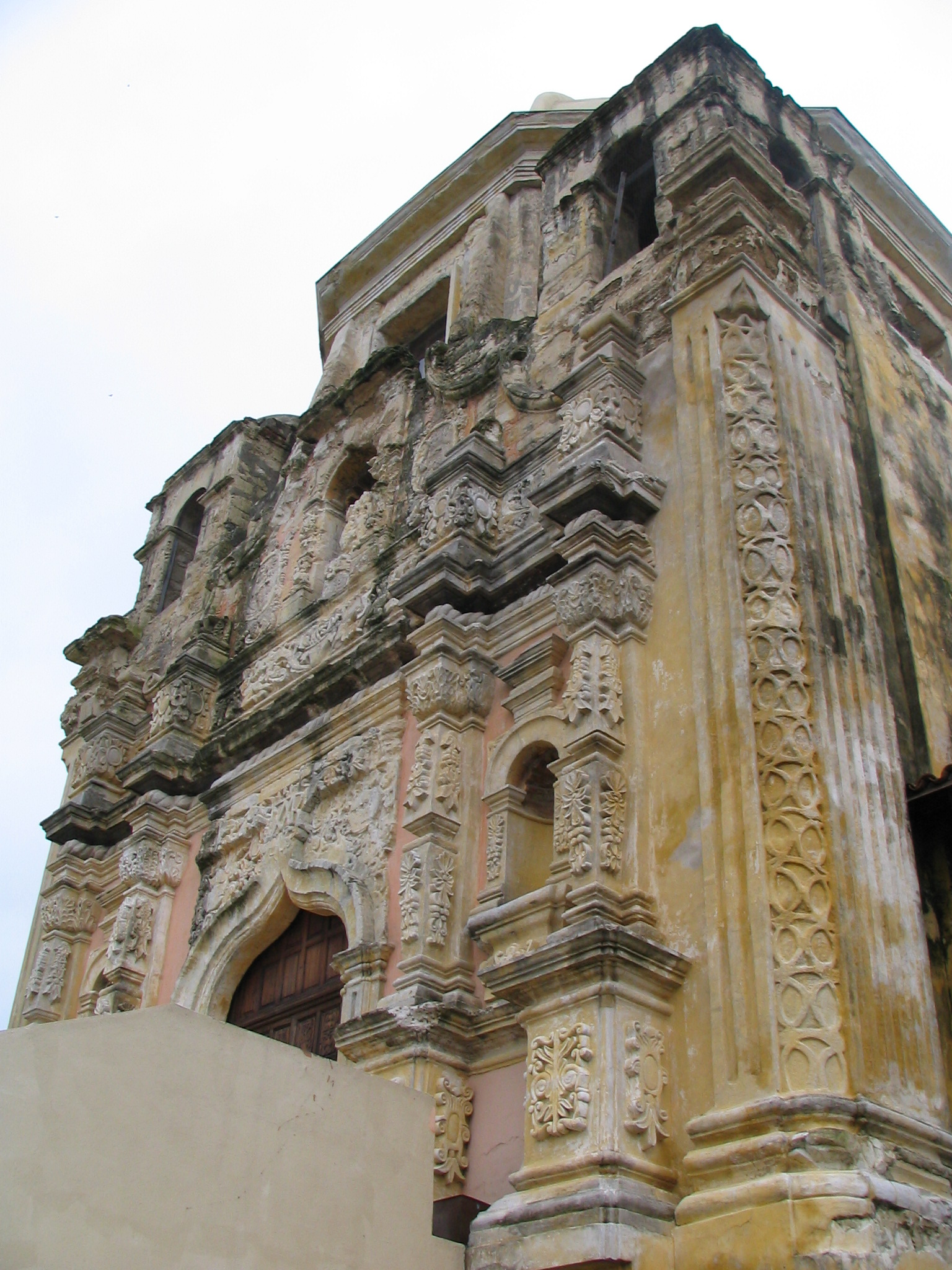
Obispado museum in Monterrey

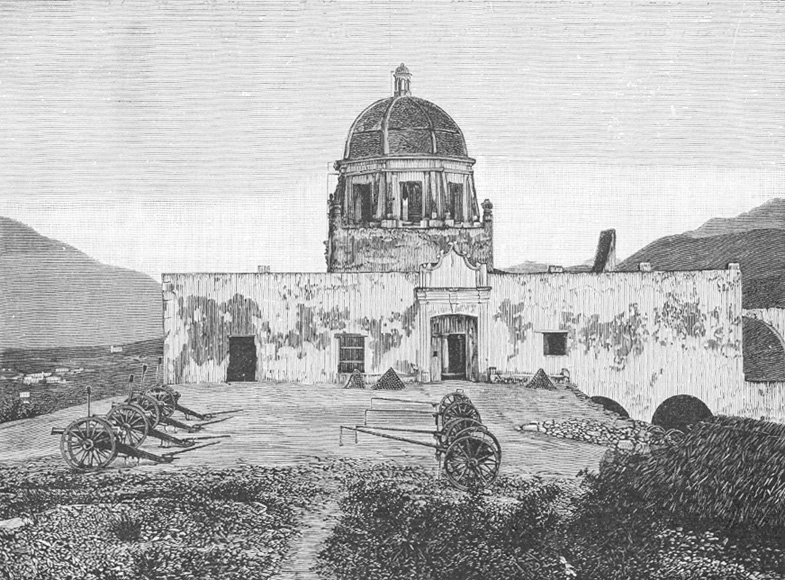
Old Episcopal Palace in Monterrey. Print from 1901.

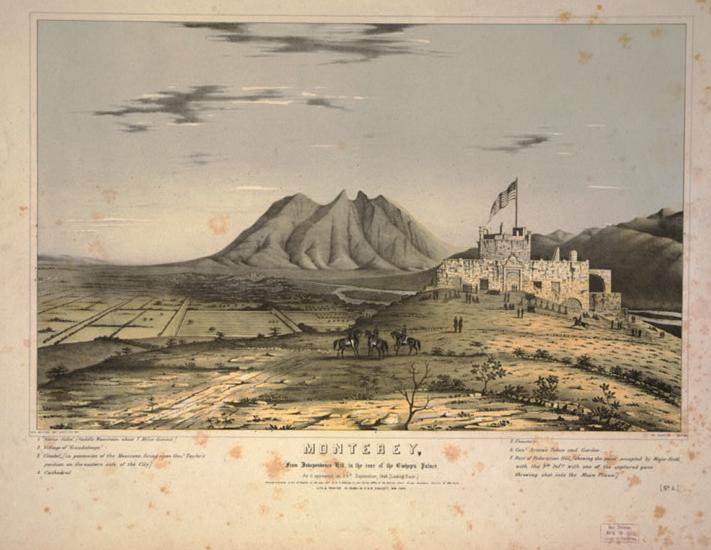
Postcard that shows the United States flag flying at the palace on the 23rd of September, 1846.

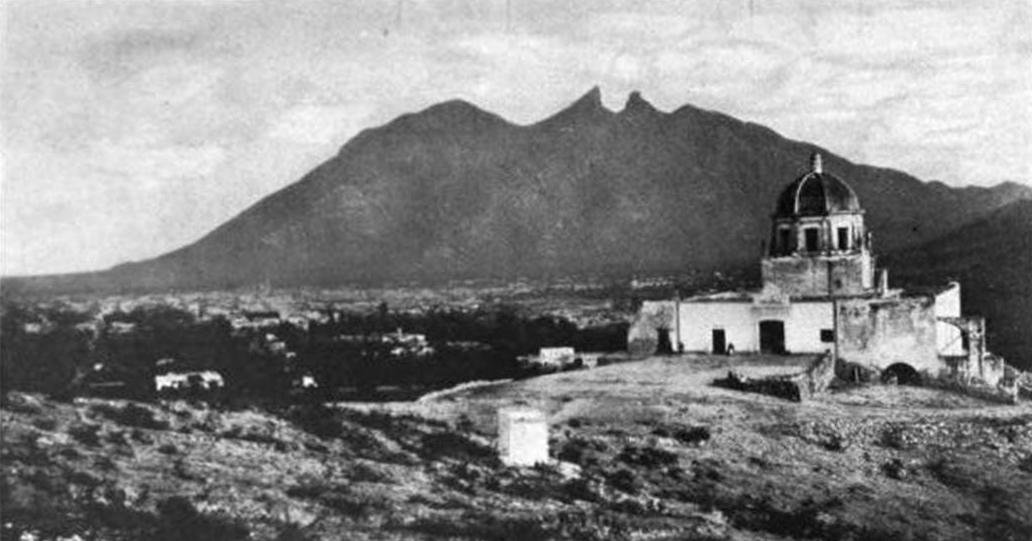
Panoramic of Cerro del Obispado.

== See also ==
- Roman Catholic Archdiocese of Monterrey
