= Banderas monumentales =

Collection of tall flagpoles containing large flags of Mexico

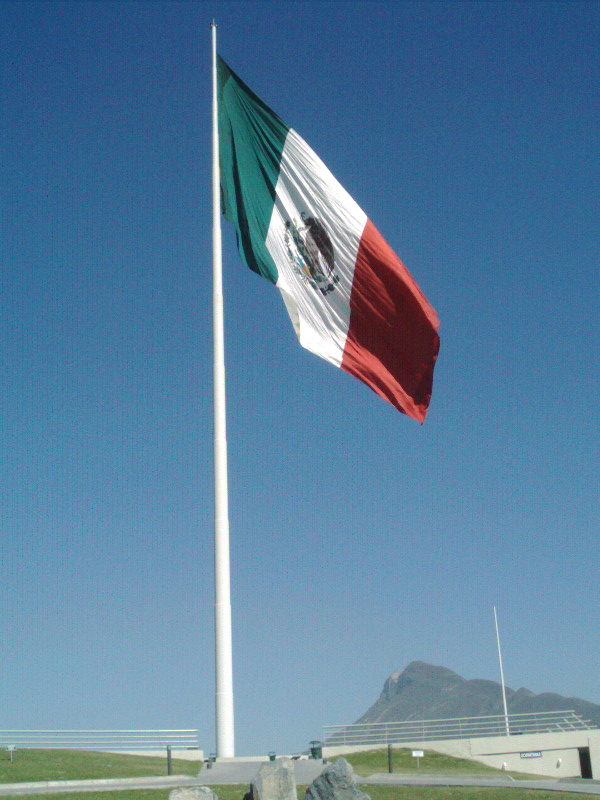
With a pole height of 100.6 metres (330 ft) and a flag measuring 50 by 28.6 metres (164 by 94 ft) Monterrey's bandera monumental is the tallest in Mexico.

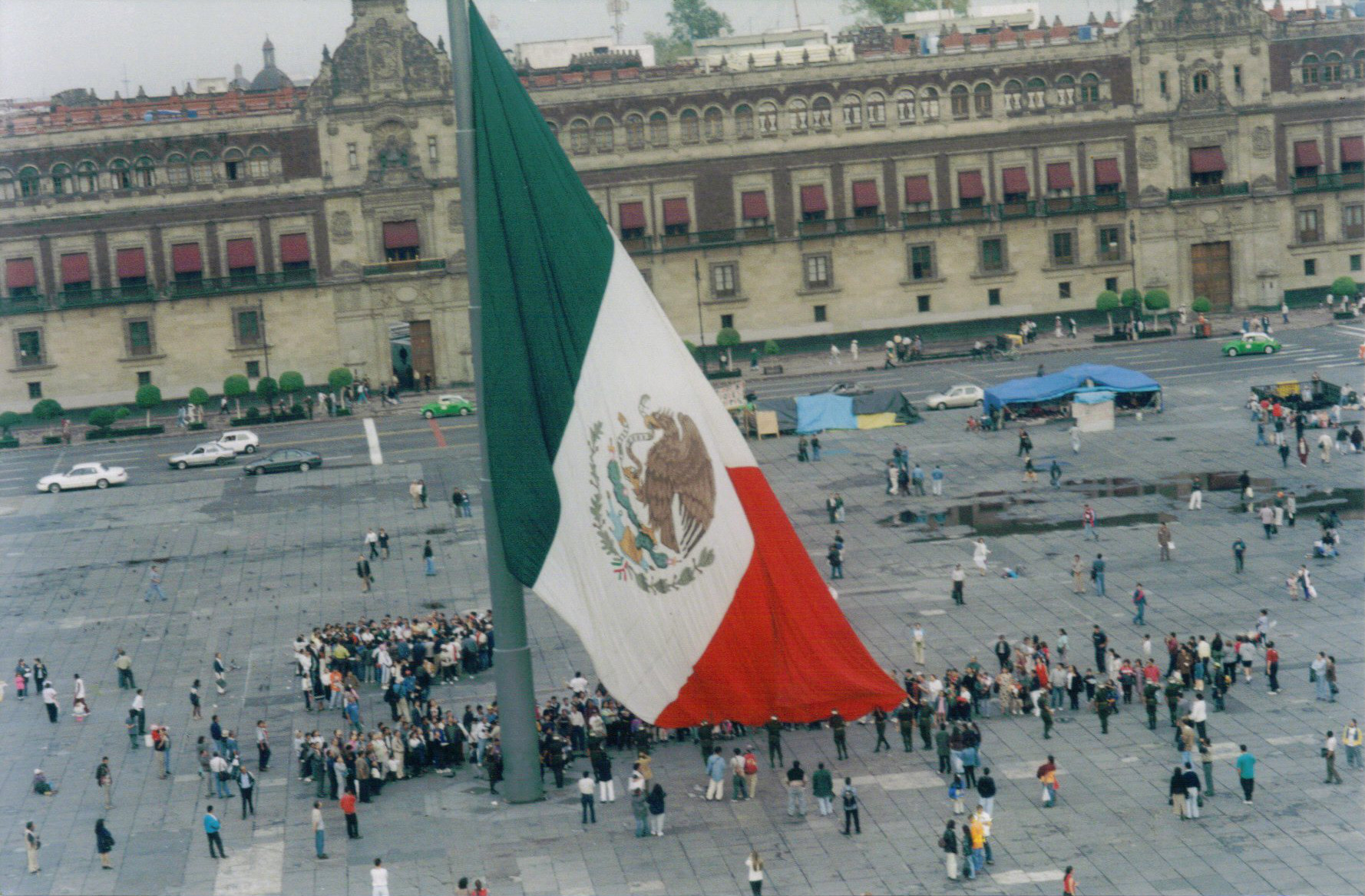
A Bandera monumental about to be raised in El Zócalo, México City

The banderas monumentales (Spanish for "monumental flags") are a collection of tall flagpoles containing large flags of Mexico located throughout Mexico. They are part of a program started in 1999 under President Ernesto Zedillo that is currently administered by the Secretariat of National Defense (Secretaría de la Defensa Nacional). The main feature of these monuments (though not the biggest, see below) is a giant Mexican flag flying off a 50-meter-high (160-foot) flagpole. The size of the flag was 14.3 by 25 metres (47 by 82 ft) and it was flown on a pole that measured 50 metres (160 ft) high. In the time after the decree was issued, many more banderas monumentales have been installed throughout the country in various sizes and proportions. Many of the chosen locations were chosen due to significant events in Mexican history that occurred there.

== The 1999 decree ==
On July 1, 1999, President Zedillo officially started the flag program by issuing a decree that was published in the government register Official Journal of the Federation. While the formation of the flag project was one aspect of the decree, the overall aims of the law were to promote the flag, the Coat of Arms and the national anthem to instill a sense of patriotism into the Mexican population. Zedillo also used the timeframe of 1995 until 2000 to promote Mexican culture and history. Finally, this decree allowed the governors of each state to display more conspicuously the national symbols (Símbolos Patrios) throughout their state.

=== The flag program ===
The deployment of banderas monumentales was outlined by Zedillo in a two-point program. The first point consisted of selecting the location for the monumental flags, of which the first were:

- Those in the military base Campo Marte, in downtown, and in the San Jerónimo roundabout in Mexico City
- Tijuana, Baja California
- Ciudad Juárez, Chihuahua
- Veracuz, Veracruz
- Iguala, Guerrero

The first two deployments were in México City, Mexico's capital. The next two were in Tijuana and Ciudad Juárez, along the northern border with the United States. Veracruz is Mexico's main seaport in the Gulf of Mexico. Finally, Iguala was where the flag of the Three Guarantees (Bandera de las Tres Garantías) recognized as Mexico's first flag, was created.

The second point in the program accounted for the creation of a standard size for the flags and the poles they would be raised on. Zedillo's official decree stated that the flag sizes will be 14.3 metres (47 ft) in height by 25 metres (82 ft) in width. The flag size is close to the 4:7 ratio as stated in Article 3 of the Law on the National Coat of Arms, Flag and Anthem (Ley sobre el Escudo, la Bandera y el Himno Nacionales). The flagpoles were to have a height of 50 metres (160 ft).

There have been smaller flags called banderas semi-monumentales installed for schools, smaller communities and other locations where logistics complicate the flying a giant flag. The flags are greatly smaller than its those outlined in the 1999 decree, but have the advantages that are cheaper and easier to take down than the monumental flags. Monumental flags are costly to construct and require a group of nearly twenty people to raise and lower them.

=== Biggest flags ===
The tallest flagpole in Mexico measures 120 meters high, weighs 150 tons, and made of steel. It was built for a 60-meter-wide national flag in Piedras Negras, Coahuila, which is the largest Mexican flag.

=== Current locations ===
Since the construction of the first monumental flags, other cities throughout the country have also deployed their own. They are mostly located in state capitals, historical towns and cities with important economic activity.

- Monterrey, Nuevo León 25°40′34.33″N 100°20′45.98″W
- Dolores Hidalgo, Cuna de la Independencia Nacional, Guanajuato 21°9′33.01″N 100°54′35.56″W
- Querétaro, Querétaro
- México City (three locations):
  - Zócalo, in the city center. 19°25′57.66″N 99°7′59.96″W
  - Campo Militar Marte (1 km northwest of Los Pinos) 19°25′27.14″N 99°11′47.84″W
  - San Jerónimo 19°19′52.11″N 99°12′39.56″W
- Iguala, Guerrero 18°19′44.67″N 99°31′58.15″W
- Tonalá, Jalisco
- Piedras Negras, Coahuila 28°42′00″N 100°31′23″W
- Tijuana, Baja California 32°31′14.87″N 117°2′11.20″W
- Chihuahua, Chihuahua
- Ciudad Juárez, Chihuahua 31°45′18.44″N 106°27′12.89″W
- Veracruz, Veracruz
- Morelia, Michoacán
- Tehuacán, Puebla
- San Luis Potosí, San Luis Potosí
- El Calvario, Toluca
- Cuautla and Cuernavaca, Morelos
- Culiacán and Mazatlán, Sinaloa
- Mérida, Yucatán
- Cancún, Quintana Roo
- Naucalpan, Estado de México
- Nuevo Laredo, Tamaulipas 27°29′51.37″N 99°30′16.45″W
- Ciudad Victoria, Tamaulipas
- Tampico, Tamaulipas
- Celaya, Guanajuato
- Irapuato, Guanajuato
- Ensenada, Baja California 31°51′33.51″N 116°37′27.34″W
- Acapulco, Guerrero 16°51′31.89″N 99°53′12.35″W
- San Miguel de Allende, Guanajuato
- Cozumel, Quintana Roo

The Tijuana, Ciudad Juárez and Nuevo Laredo flags overlook the United States border and can be clearly seen from the U. S. side.

=== Gallery ===
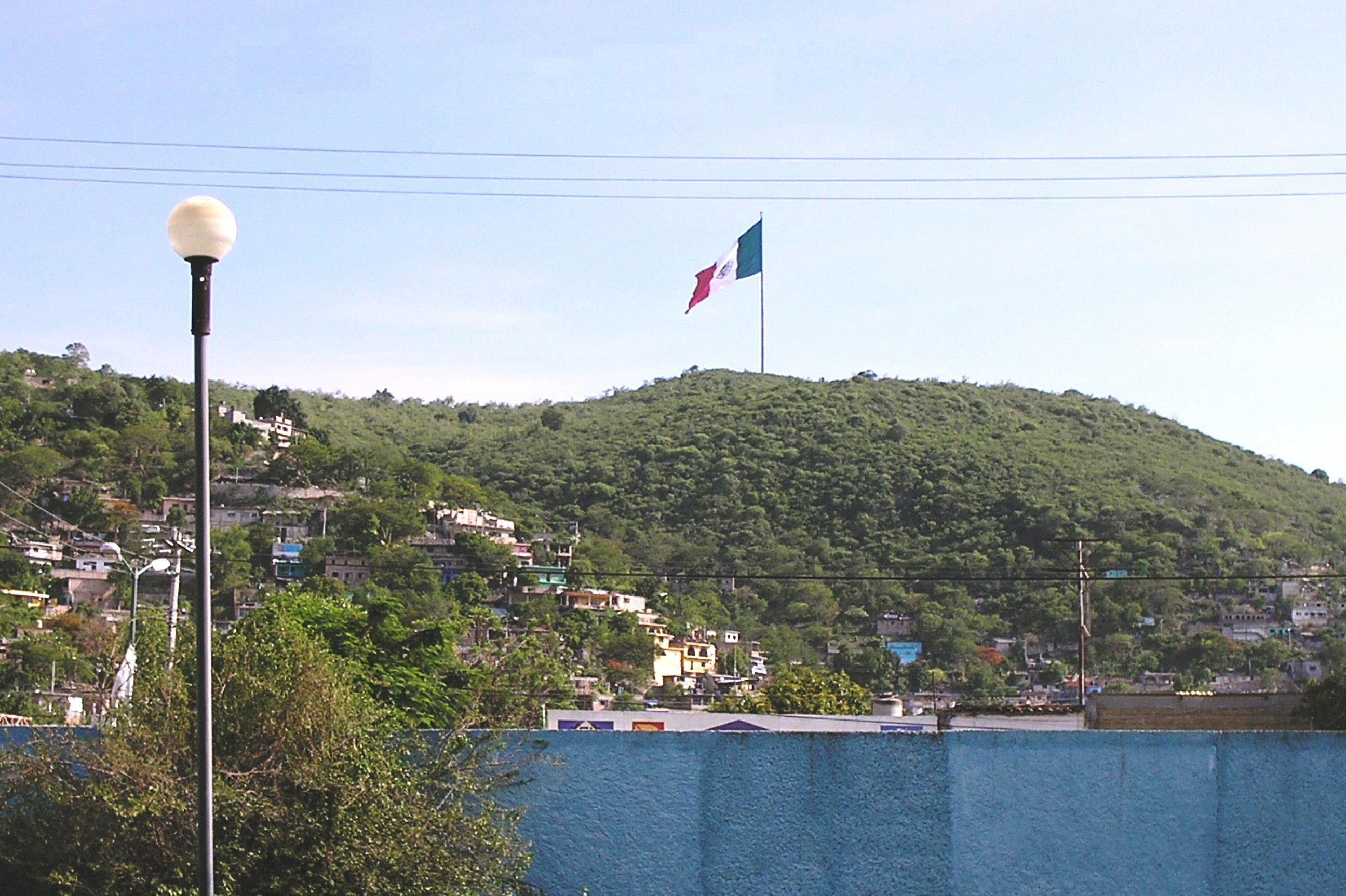
Iguala, Guerrero

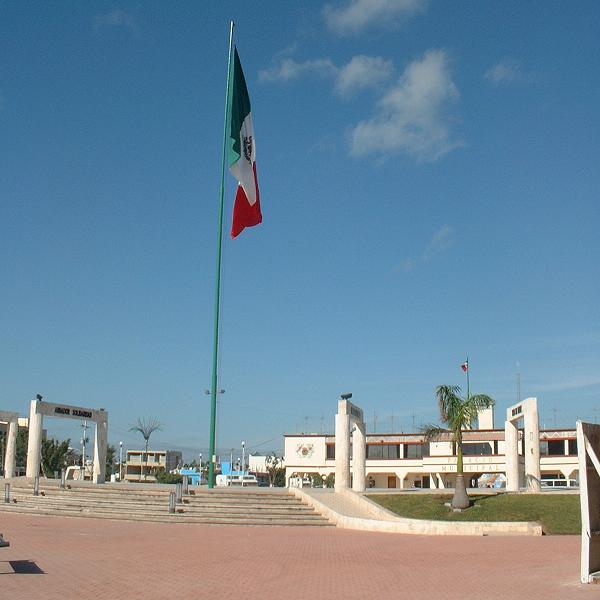
Playa del Carmen, Quintana Roo

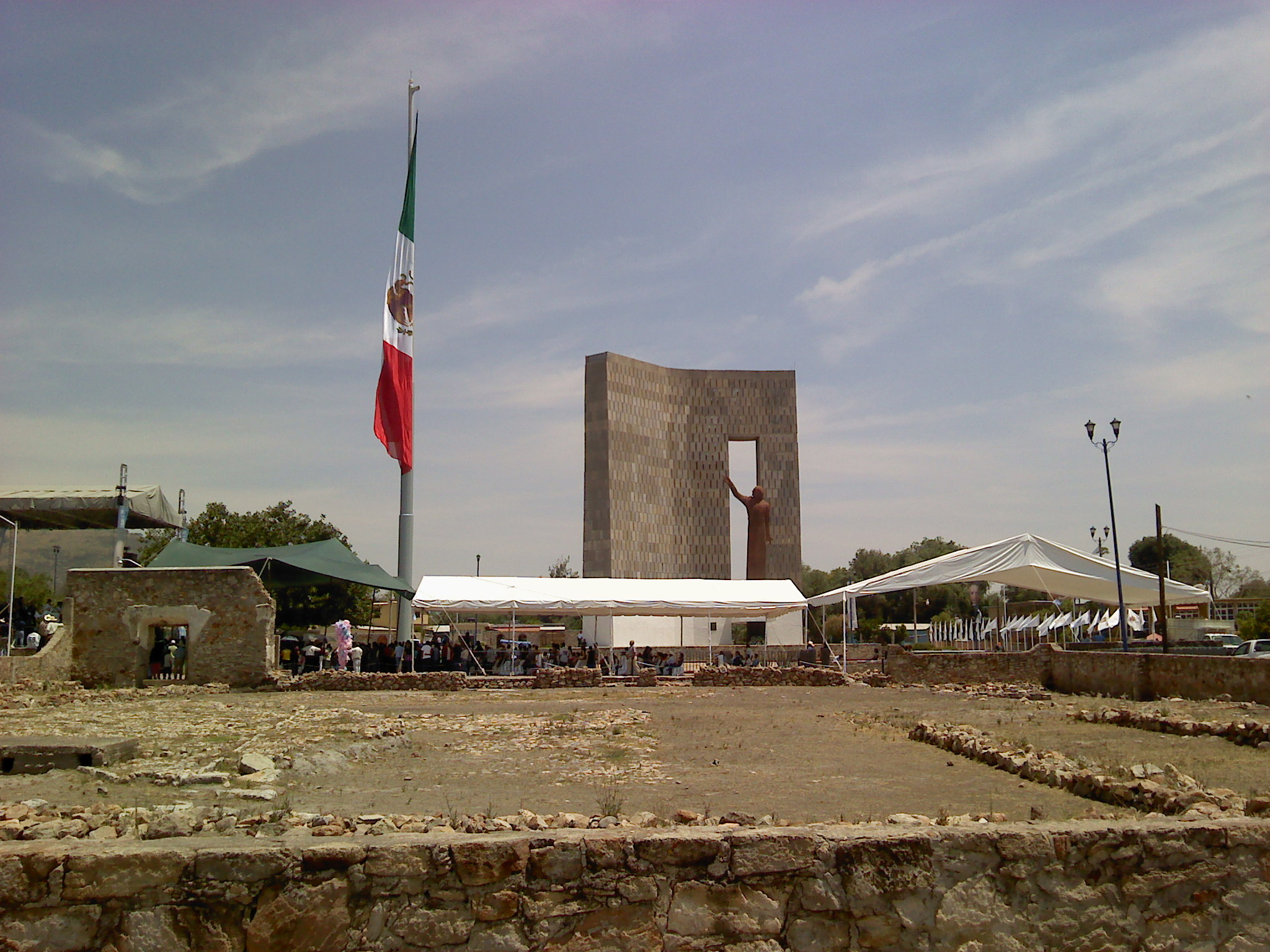
Corralejo Hidalgo, Pénjamo, Guanajuato

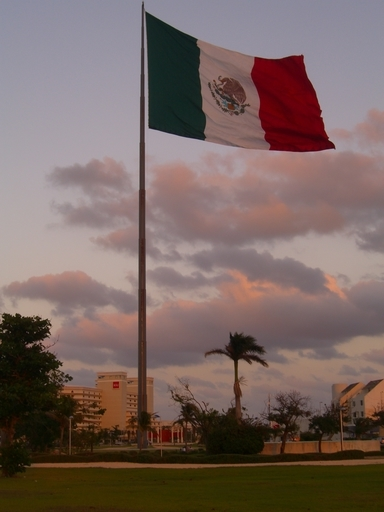
Cancún, Quintana Roo

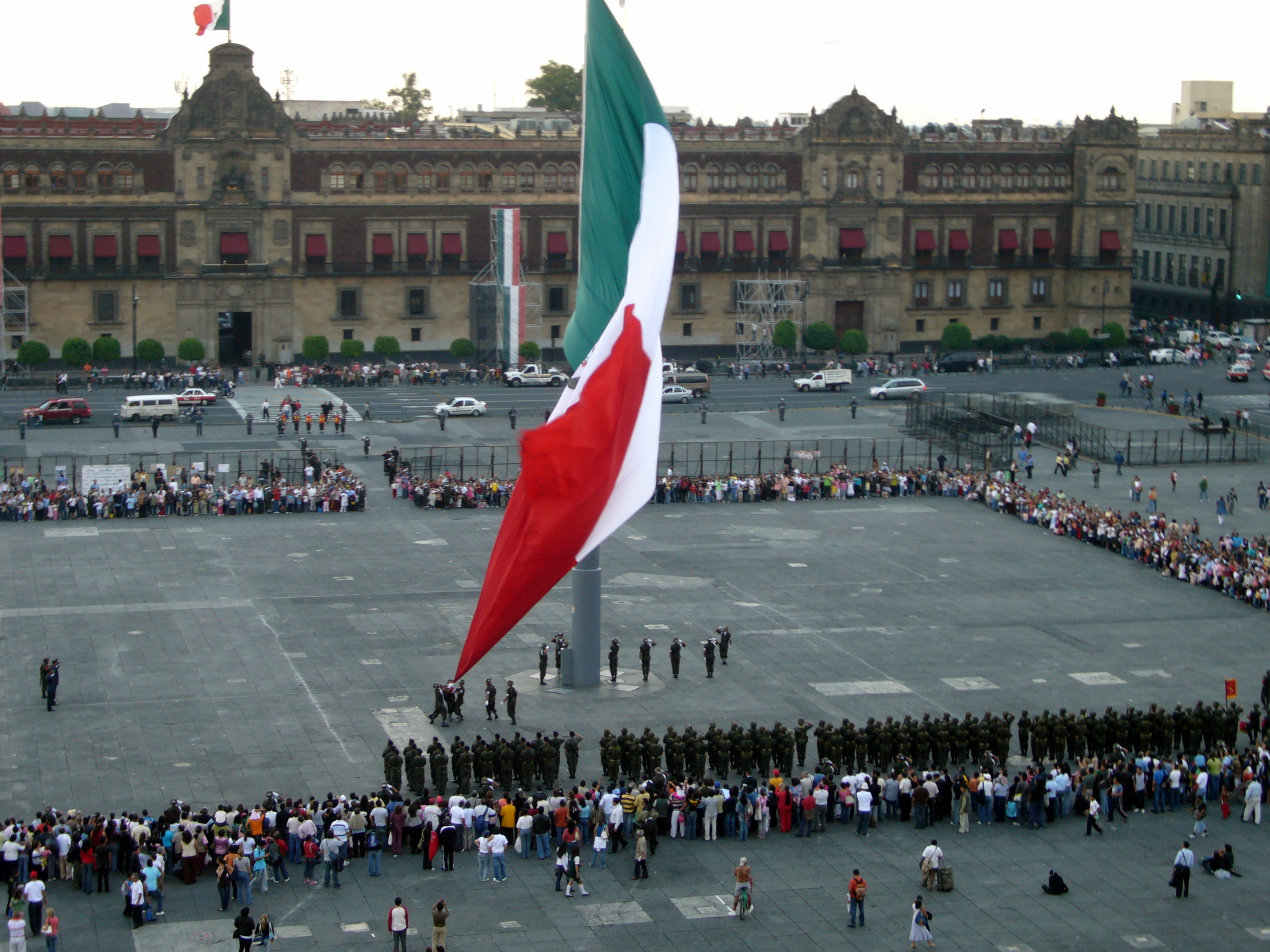
Zócalo, Mexico City

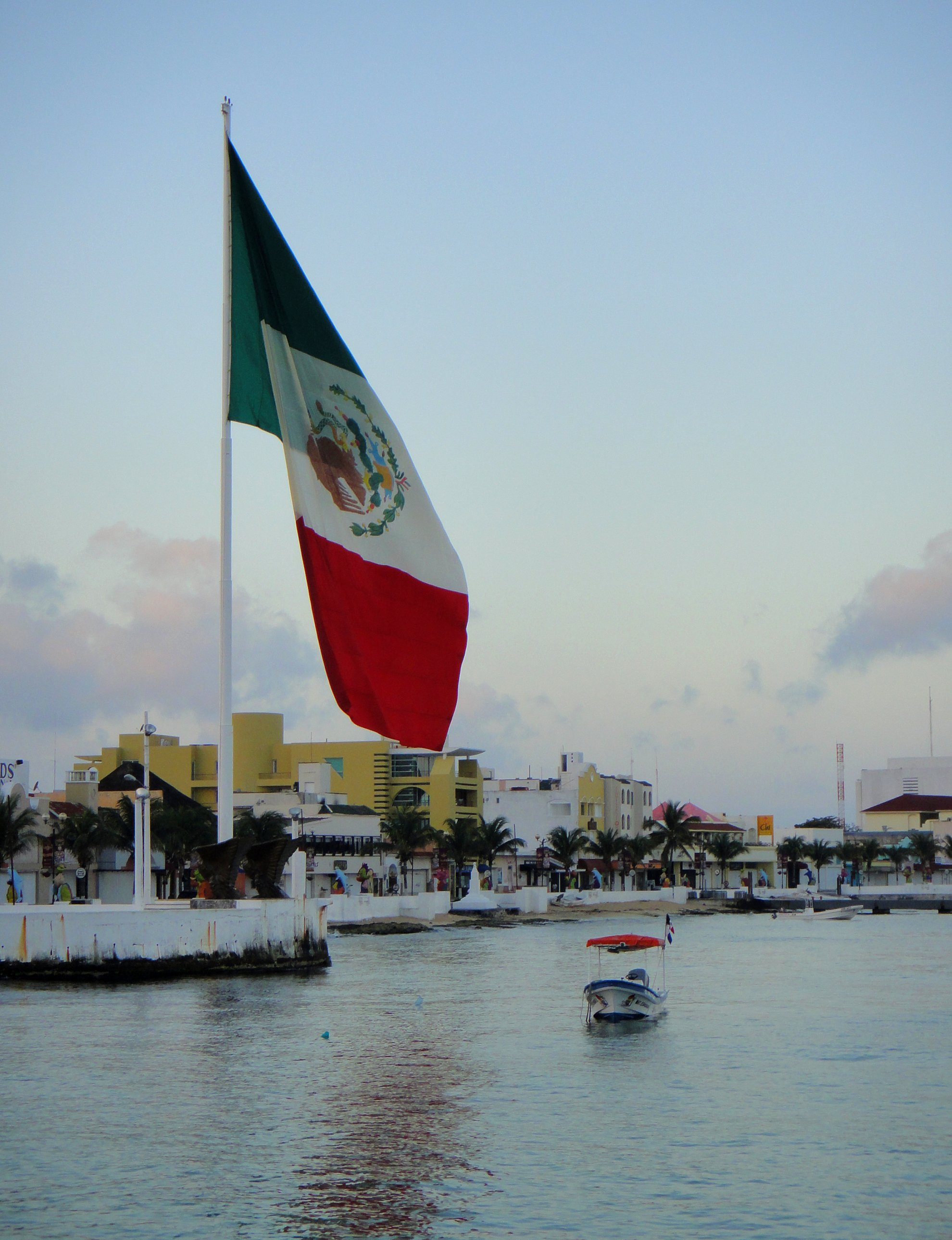
Cozumel, Quintana Roo

Acapulco, Guerrero

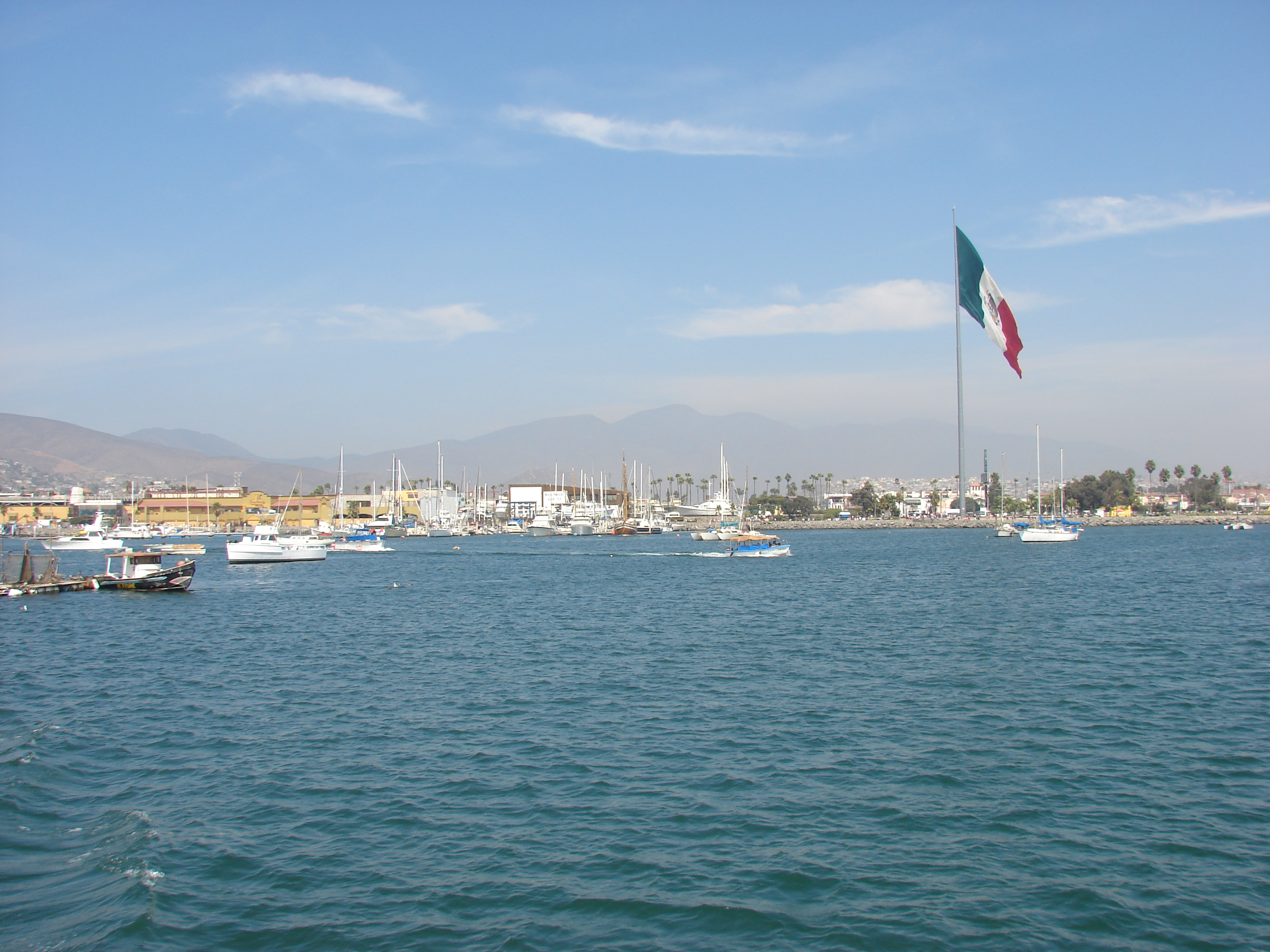
Ensenada, Baja California

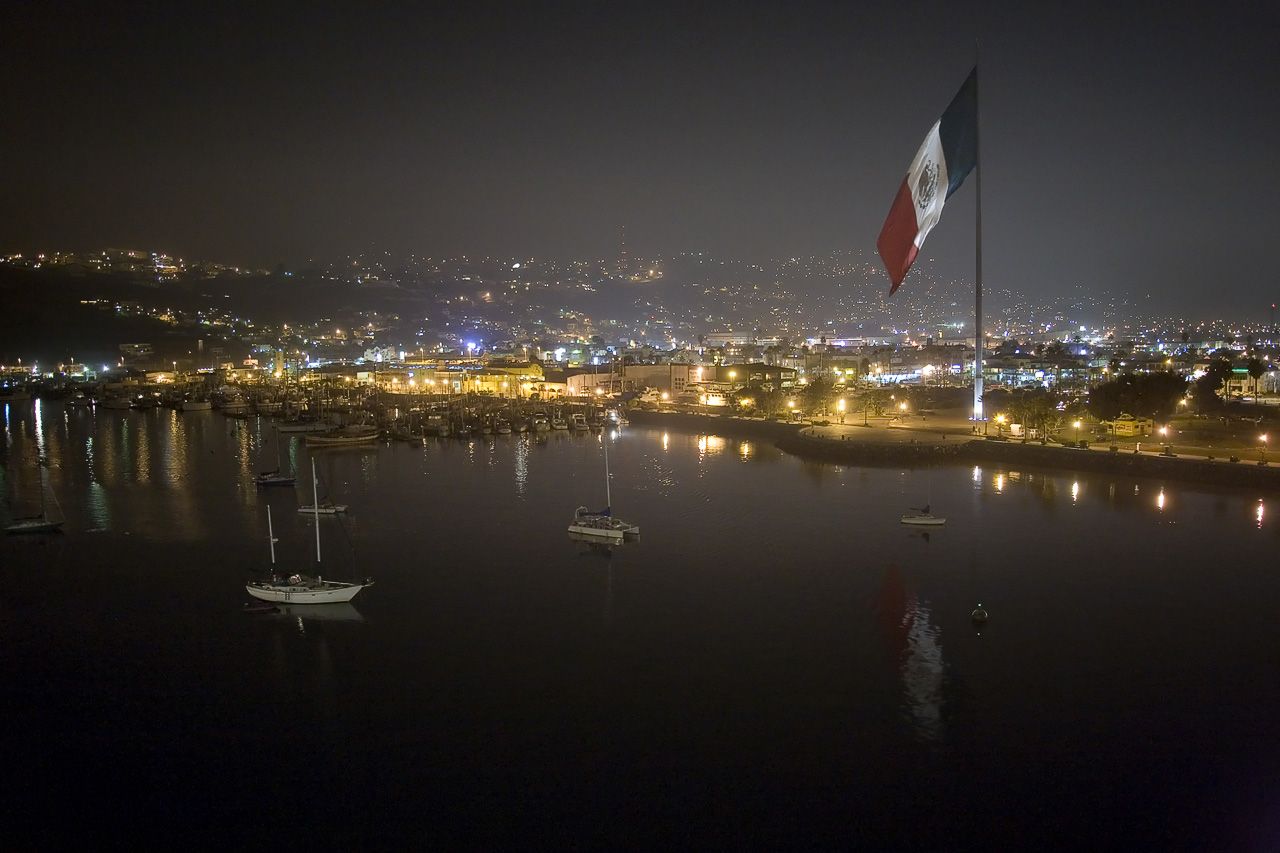
Ensenada, Baja California

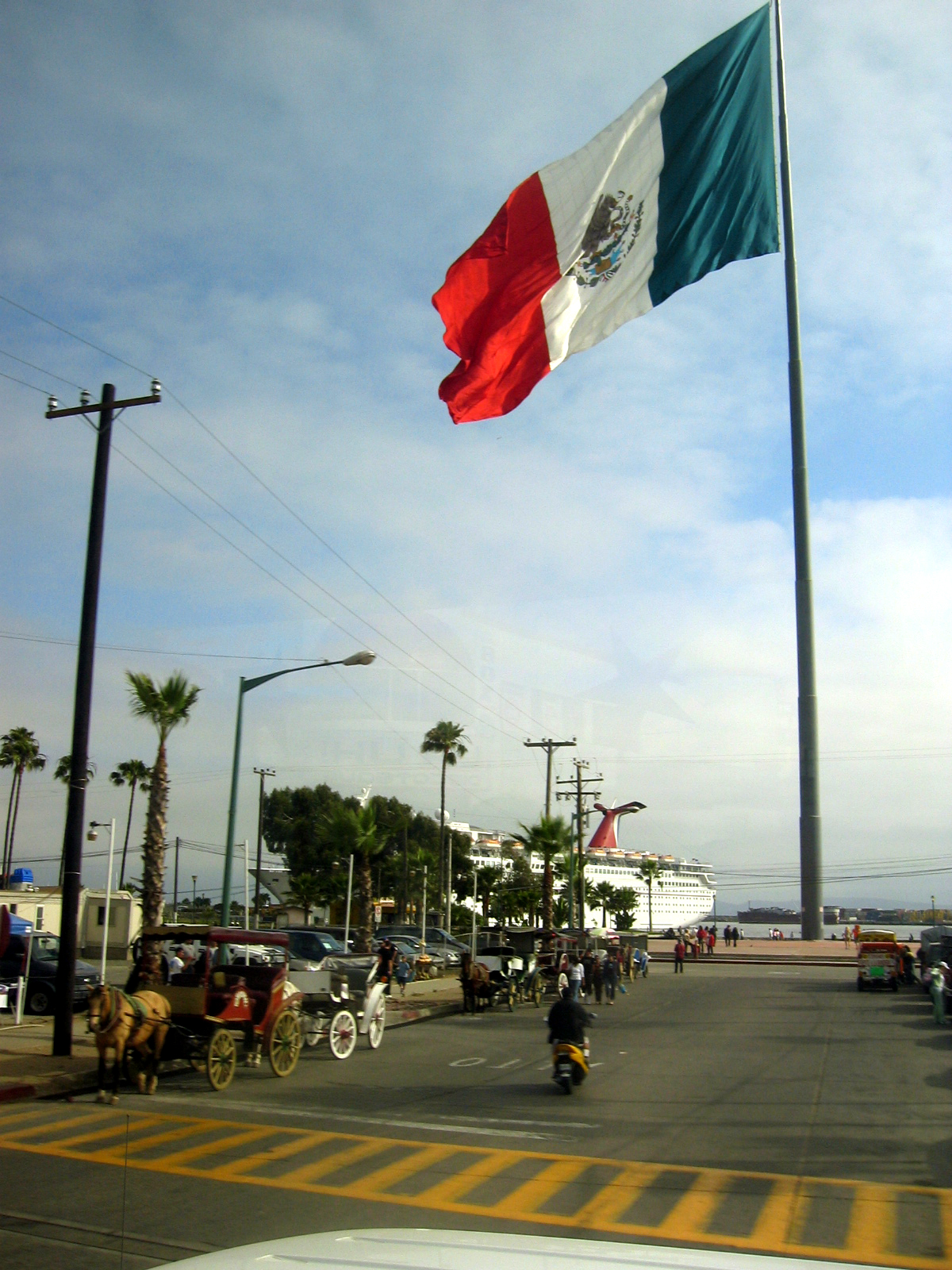
Ensenada, Baja California

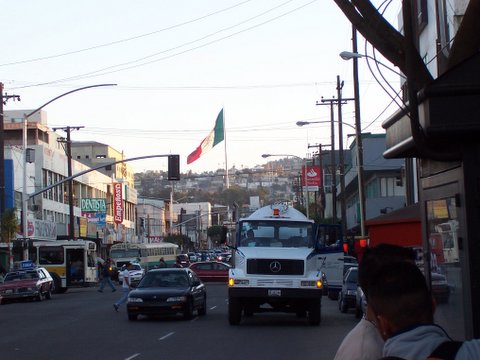
Tijuana, Baja California

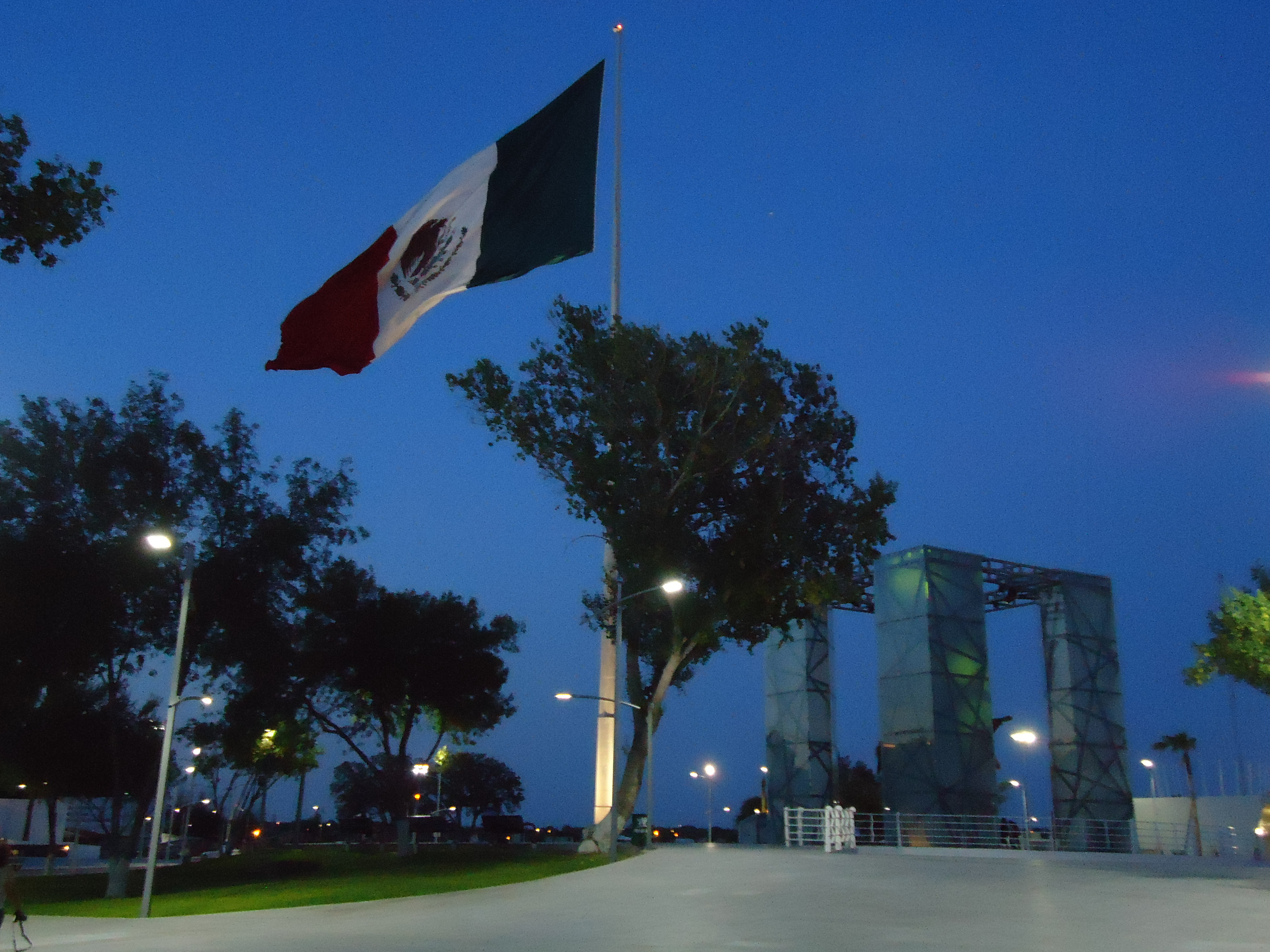
Piedras Negras, Coahuila

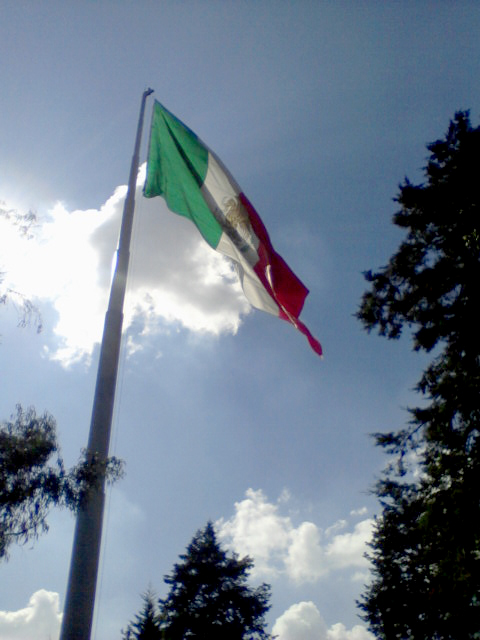
El Calvario, Toluca

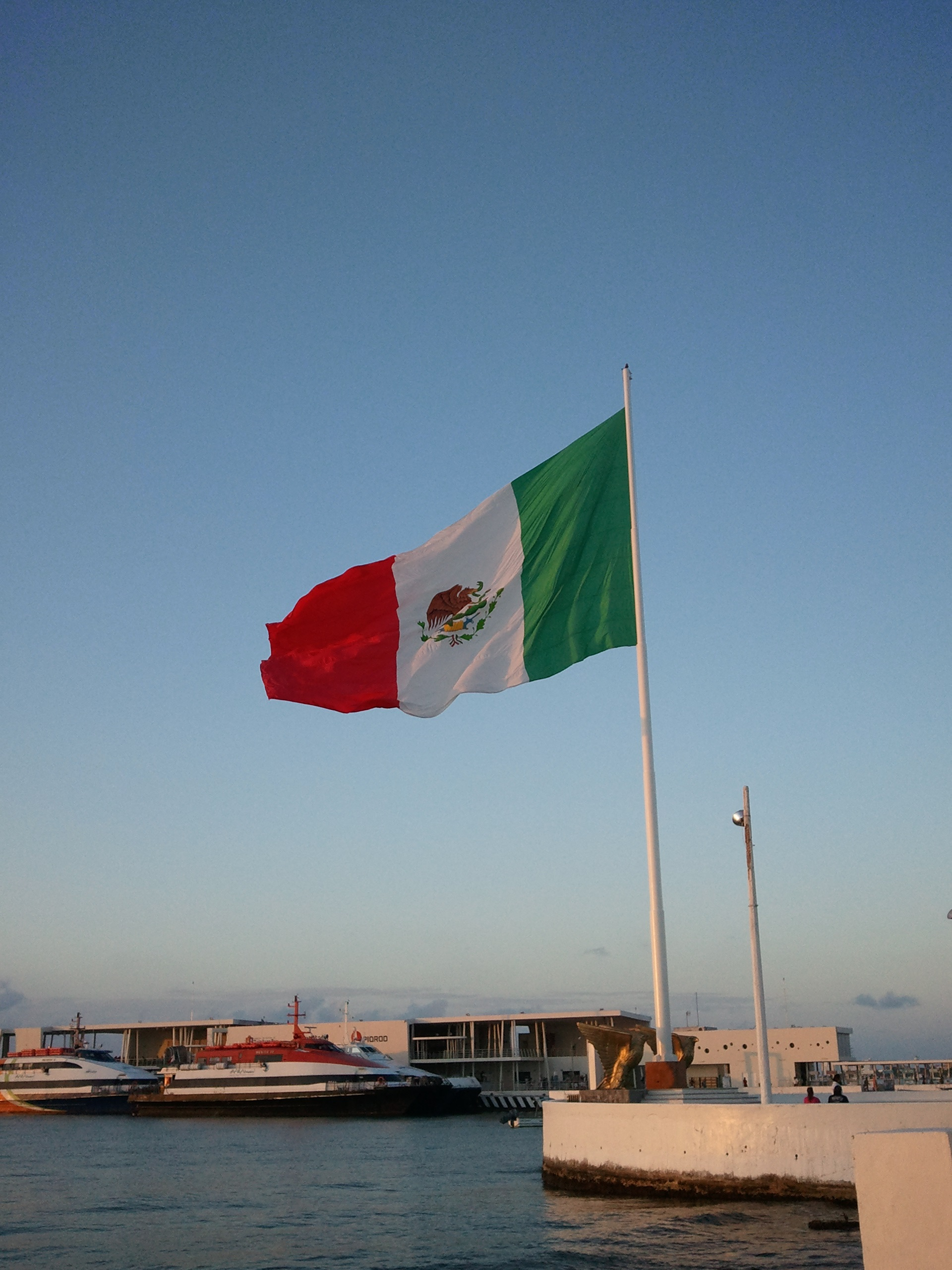
San Miguel de Cozumel, Quintana Roo
