= Ricardo Watty Urquidi =

His Excellency, The Most Reverend Ricardo Watty Urquidi
- Church: Catholic Church
- Diocese: Diocese of Tepic
- Appointed: February 21, 2008
- Installed: April 11, 2008
- Predecessor: Alfonso Humberto Robles Cota
- Successor: Luis Artemio Flores Calzada
- Previous posts: Auxiliary Bishop of Archdiocese of Mexico & Titular Bishop of Macomades (1980‍–‍1989); Bishop of Diocese of Nuevo Laredo in Mexico (1989‍–‍2008)

Orders
- Ordination: June 8, 1968 by Francisco Orozco Lomelí
- Consecration: July 19, 1980 by Ernesto Corripio Ahumada

Personal details
- Born: Ricardo Watty Urquidi; July 16, 1938 San Diego, California, US
- Died: November 1, 2011 (aged 73) Tepic, Nayarit, MEX
- Motto: Hágase tu voluntad (Spanish for 'Thy will be done')
- Styles
- Reference style: His Excellency; The Most Reverend
- Spoken style: Your Excellency
- Religious style: Bishop

Ricardo Watty Urquidi, M.Sp.S. (July 16, 1938 – November 1, 2011) was a Mexican-American Roman Catholic bishop and a member of the Congregation of the Missionaries of the Holy Spirit. At the time of his death, he was serving as the seventh Bishop of the Diocese of Tepic in Nayarit, Mexico.

== Biography ==
He was born in San Diego, California, on July 16, 1938, to Carlos Watty and María de los Dolores Urquidi, the eldest of five children. He grew up with his family in Tijuana, Baja California, where he attended La Paz School and San Isidro Academy.

== Missionary of the Holy Spirit ==
At the age of 13, he entered the Apostolic School of the Congregation of the Missionaries of the Holy Spirit in Tlalpan, Mexico City. In 1956 he entered the novitiate, and two years later he professed his religious vows as a Missionary of the Holy Spirit.

At age 18, he formally renounced the U.S. citizenship to which he was entitled by birth and retained his Mexican nationality.

He studied philosophy from 1959 to 1961. That same year, he was sent to the Diocese of Alajuela in Costa Rica, where he served as a teacher and formator at the minor seminary operated by his congregation. He later returned to Mexico to complete his theological studies.

On June 8, 1968, he was ordained a priest at the Parish of the Holy Cross of Pedregal in Mexico City. He was then assigned as a formator at the minor seminary in Quetzaltenango, Guatemala, also entrusted to his congregation.

He later returned to Mexico City to serve for two years as a formator at the novitiate of the Missionaries of the Holy Spirit.

From 1971 to 1975, he served both as superior of his religious community and pastor of Our Lady of the Incarnation Parish in Mexicaltzingo, Iztapalapa. For three years he also served the Archdiocese of Mexico as Episcopal Delegate for the Seventh Pastoral Zone. In 1975, he was appointed rector of his congregation’s theological seminary.

== Episcopacy ==
On May 31, 1980, Pope John Paul II appointed him Auxiliary Bishop of the Archdiocese of Mexico and assigned him the titular see of Macomades. He was consecrated bishop at the Basilica of Guadalupe on July 19, 1980, by Cardinal Ernesto Corripio Ahumada. The co-consecrators were Bishop José de Jesús Madera Uribe, M.Sp.S., of Fresno, California, and Alfredo Torres Romero, then Auxiliary Bishop of Mexico City.

He headed the Second Pastoral Vicariate of the Archdiocese as Episcopal Vicar and also served as Episcopal Vicar for the Laity throughout the Archdiocese of Mexico.

On January 10, 1990, Pope John Paul II established the Diocese of Nuevo Laredo and appointed him its first bishop. He led the diocese for eighteen years.

=== Aparecida, Brazil ===
In 2007, he was among the thirteen Mexican bishops who participated in the Fifth General Conference of the Latin American Episcopal Council held in Aparecida, Brazil, from May 13 to 31, 2007, under the theme: “Disciples and Missionaries of Jesus Christ, so that our peoples may have life in Him.” The experience deeply influenced him and inspired him to promote a renewed missionary spirit in evangelization, especially through the accompaniment and formation of the laity.

=== Diocese of Tepic ===
On February 21, 2008, Pope Benedict XVI appointed him the seventh Bishop of Tepic, succeeding Bishop Alfonso Humberto Robles Cota upon the latter’s retirement due to age.

On April 11 of that year, he formally took canonical possession of the diocese during a Eucharistic celebration held at the Concha Acústica in Tepic, attended by more than four thousand people. The first part of the Mass was presided over by Cardinal Juan Sandoval Íñiguez, with thirty-five bishops and more than two hundred priests participating. Apostolic Nuncio Christophe Pierre presented him with the papal bull appointing him Bishop of Tepic.

=== Apostolic Visitor to the Legionaries of Christ ===
In April 2009, Pope Benedict XVI selected him as one of five Apostolic Visitors tasked with conducting a worldwide review of the Legionaries of Christ. Bishop Ricardo Watty visited forty-three communities of the congregation throughout Latin America, interviewed 360 Legionaries, and listened attentively to victims.

In his reports to the Holy See, he called for a renewal and purification of the congregation’s formation system and emphasized the urgent need to restructure its authority in a way that would be genuinely evangelical.

=== Pastoral Initiatives ===
In Tepic, he presided over the Tenth National Youth Missionary Congress (CONAJUM), held from July 23 to 26, 2009, with more than ten thousand young participants from across Mexico. The event sought to strengthen Christian identity as missionary disciples. During the closing Mass, he launched the “Continental Mission” in the diocese, following one of the commitments made by the bishops at Aparecida, encouraging the Church to live in a “permanent state of mission.” He presented a cross to each parish as a symbol of that mission.

On November 13, 2010, after two years of reflection and diocesan assemblies following a forward-looking pastoral methodology, he promulgated the First Diocesan Pastoral Plan titled Living Church: Missionary Disciples in Communion.

He implemented structured catechetical instruction throughout the diocese, inaugurated the “Anacleto González Flores” Biblical-Theological Institute for Lay Formation, and established a Diocesan Council for Economic Affairs. He also instituted the first permanent diaconate class in the diocese and proclaimed a “Day of the Laity.”

During his episcopal ministry in Tepic, he ordained eight deacons and two priests. The last Eucharistic celebration he presided over took place on Saturday, October 29, 2011, at the Cathedral of Tepic, during the visit of the relics of the then Blessed John Paul II to the diocese.

=== Death and Burial ===
He died at Sanatorio de La Loma in Tepic from pancreatic cancer. At the time of his death on November 1, 2011, Bishop Ricardo Watty Urquidi was 73 years old and had served 43 years as a priest and 31 years as a bishop.

His funeral Mass was celebrated at the Cathedral of Tepic, filled with faithful mourners, and was presided over by Cardinal Juan Sandoval Íñiguez, Metropolitan Archbishop of Guadalajara. Twelve bishops and 175 priests concelebrated the Mass, including clergy from Tepic, Nuevo Laredo, and the Missionaries of the Holy Spirit. His remains were interred in the bishops’ crypt of the cathedral.

== Notes ==
Catholic Church titles
Preceded by Alfonso Humberto Robles Cota	Bishop of Tepic; 2008–2011	Succeeded by Luis Artemio Flores Calzada
Preceded by First in the position	Bishop of Nuevo Laredo; 1989–2008	Succeeded by Gustavo Rodríguez Vega
Preceded by –	Auxiliary Bishop of Mexico; 1980–1989	Succeeded by –
