= Nuevo Laredo Cathedral =

Catedral Del Espiritu Santo
- Catedral Del Espiritu Santo
- 27.4679°N 99.5063°W
- Location: Nuevo Laredo, Tamaulipas
- Country: Mexico
- Denomination: Roman Catholic

History
- Founded: 1989

Administration
- Diocese: Nuevo Laredo

Clergy
- Bishop: Ricardo Watty Urquidi

The Catedral Del Espiritu Santo is the seat of the Roman Catholic Diocese of Nuevo Laredo. It is located at Paseo Colon Avenue in the heart of the midtown Nuevo Laredo. The first bishop to sit here was Ricardo Watty Urquidi. As of 2000, the cathedral was the mother church for 800,000 Catholics in the diocese.

== Bishops ==
- Ricardo Watty Urquidi, M.Sp.S. (1989–2008),
- Gustavo Rodriquez Vega, (2008–2015)
