= Macomades =

Ancient city in Numidia

Macomades was a Numidian and Roman city in North Africa. It was located near present-day Oum-El-Bouaghi, Algeria

== History ==
Macomades was established as an inland Punic trading post under the name mqmʾ (Punic: 𐤌𐤒𐤌𐤀, "Place"). It was about 64 kilometers (40 mi) from Cirta. It issued its own bronze coins with an Egyptian-style god's head obverse and a reverse bearing either a hog and galloping horse or a disk in a crescent, a symbol of the Punic goddess Tanit.

It was a town in the Roman province of Numidia.

It was overrun by the Umayyad Caliphate during the 7th-century Muslim invasion.

== Religion ==
No later than AD 256, the town was the seat of a Christian bishop. The diocese was in abeyance after the Muslim conquest of the region until it was restored by the Roman Catholic Church in 1933 as a titular bishopric (diocesis Macomadensis).

=== List of bishops ===
- Cassius, at the council of Carthage called in 256 by Saint Cyprianus to discuss the 'lapsed' Christians who preferred forced idolatry to martyrdom
- Donatus, mentioned after 406, praised by Saint Augustine of Hippo in Contra Cresconium for abjuring the heresy Donatism
- Aurelius participated in the 411 council of Carthage (where both Catholic and heretical bishops were invited) as well as his Donatist counterpart from Macomades, Sallustius
- Pardalius was exiled after participating in the 484 synod of Carthage, called by the Vandal king Huneric, an Arian; in 487 he parttook, probably as Numidian delegate, in Pope Felix III's Lateran Council.
- Florentino Armas Lerena (8 April 1967 – 25 November 1979), while first Bishop-Prelate of Territorial Prelature of Chota and still on emeritate
- Ricardo Watty Urquidi (27 May 1980 – 6 November 1989), as Auxiliary Bishop of Mexico City, later Bishop of Nuevo Laredo, Bishop of Tepic
- Francisco Clavel Gil (from 27 June 2001), emeritus as former Auxiliary Bishop emeritus of Mexico City

== See also ==
- List of Catholic dioceses in Algeria
