= Bicentenario Stadium =

Bicentenario Stadium may refer to:

== Argentina ==
- Estadio San Juan del Bicentenario, in Pocito Department.
- Bicentenario Ciudad de Catamarca Stadium, in Catamarca.

== Bolivia ==
- Bicentenario de Villa Tunari Stadium, in Villa Tunari.

== Chile ==
- Estadio Regional Bicentenario Calvo y Bascuñan, in Antofagasta.
- Estadio Bicentenario Municipal Nelson Oyarzún, in Chillán.
- Estadio Bicentenario Luis Valenzuela Hermosilla, in Copiapó.
- Estadio Bicentenario Francisco Sánchez Rumoroso, in Coquimbo.
- Estadio Bicentenario de La Florida, in Santiago.
- Estadio Bicentenario Germán Becker, in Temuco.

== Mexico ==
- Estadio del Bicentenario, in Tepic.

== Paraguay ==
- Bicentenario Nacional Stadium, in Ypacaraí.

== Venezuela ==
- Bicentenario Stadium, in Caracas.
