= Tepic Cathedral =

Coordinates: 21.5118°N 104.8912°W

Immaculate Conception Cathedral, Tepic
- Catedral de la Purísima Concepción
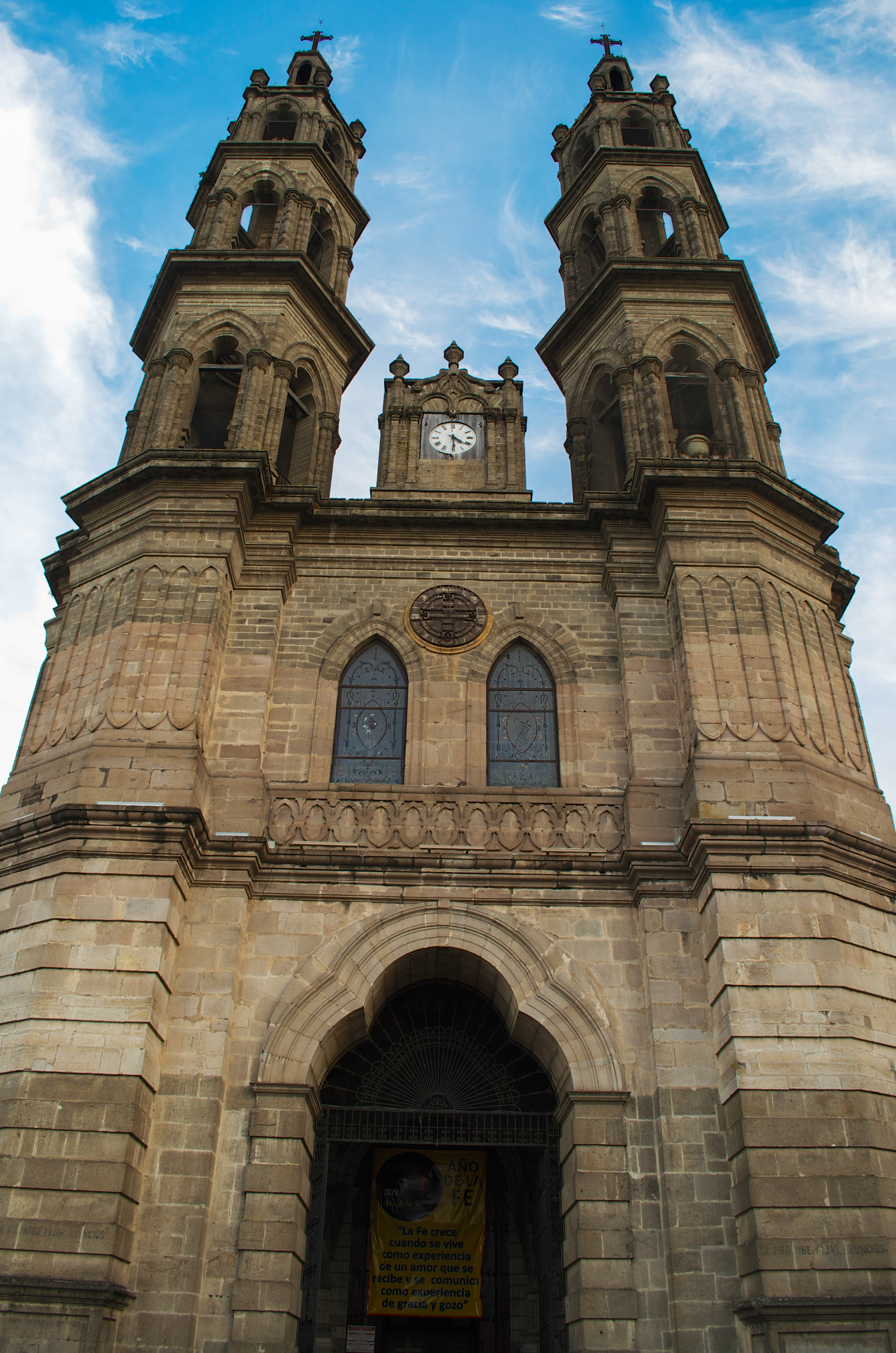
- Immaculate Conception Cathedral, Tepic
- Location: Tepic
- Country: Mexico
- Denomination: Roman Catholic Church

History
- Status: Cathedral

Architecture
- Functional status: Active
- Style: Neoclassical, Neogothic
- Years built: 1750-1885

The Immaculate Conception Cathedral (Spanish: Catedral de la Purísima Concepción), also known as Tepic Cathedral, is the cathedral of the Roman Catholic Diocese of Tepic in Mexico. It is located on the main square, in the center of the city. It is famous for its Neo-Gothic style architecture.

The first building, smaller in size than the current structure, was built around 1750.

At the beginning of the nineteenth century, it was decided to construct a larger cathedral. Construction was completed in the year 1885. The church was designated as a cathedral by Pope Leo XIII, on June 23, 1891, with its first bishop Ignacio Díaz y Macedo.

The current facade was designed by Gabriel Luna y Rodriguez, who continued the previous facade work in a Neo-Gothic style, different from the neoclassical taste that prevailed at the time. The last tower was completed in 1896.

The interior was modified in the 19th century, replacing the main altar with a large cross.

== See also ==
- Roman Catholicism in Mexico
- Immaculate Conception Cathedral

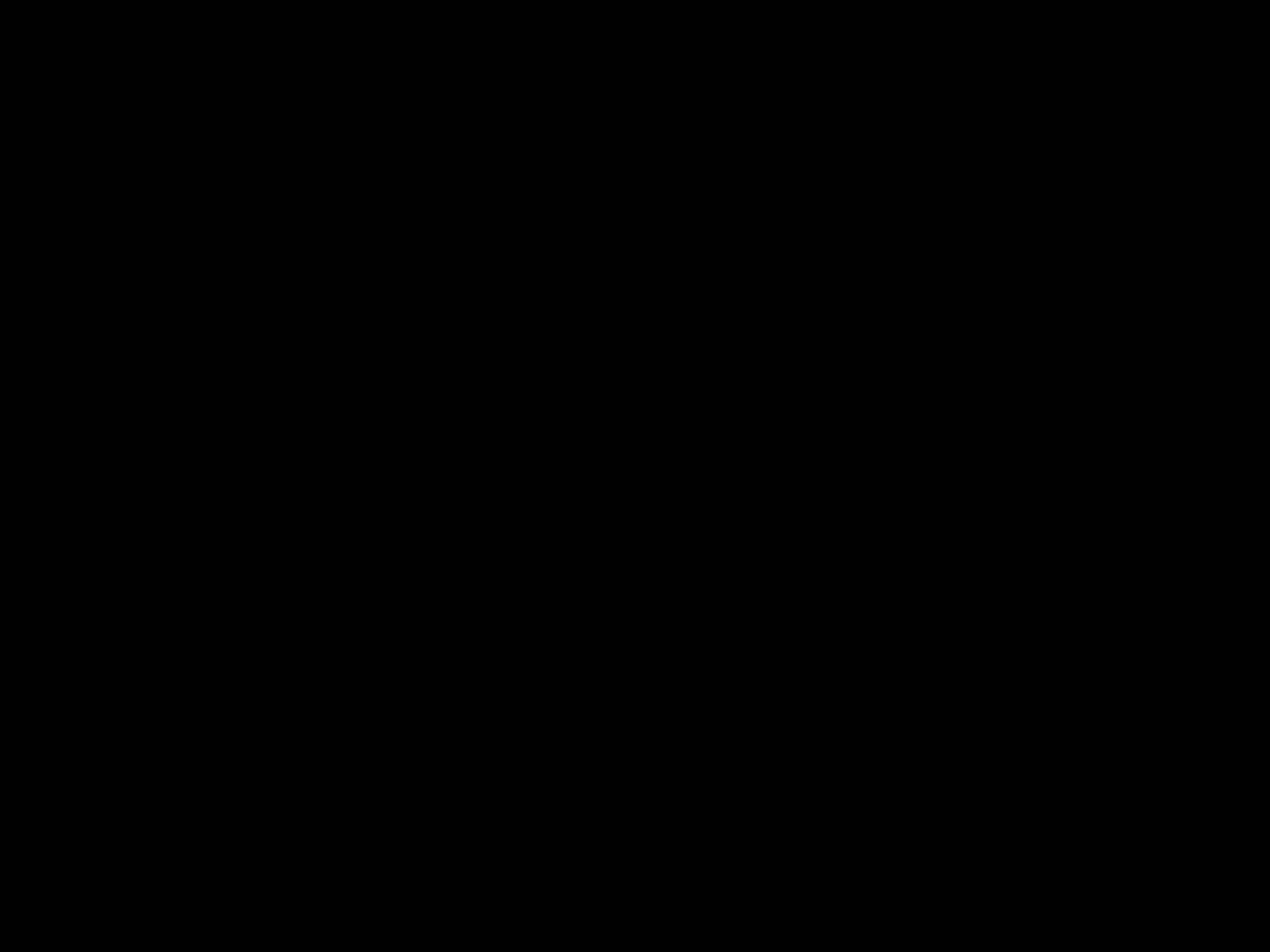
Place

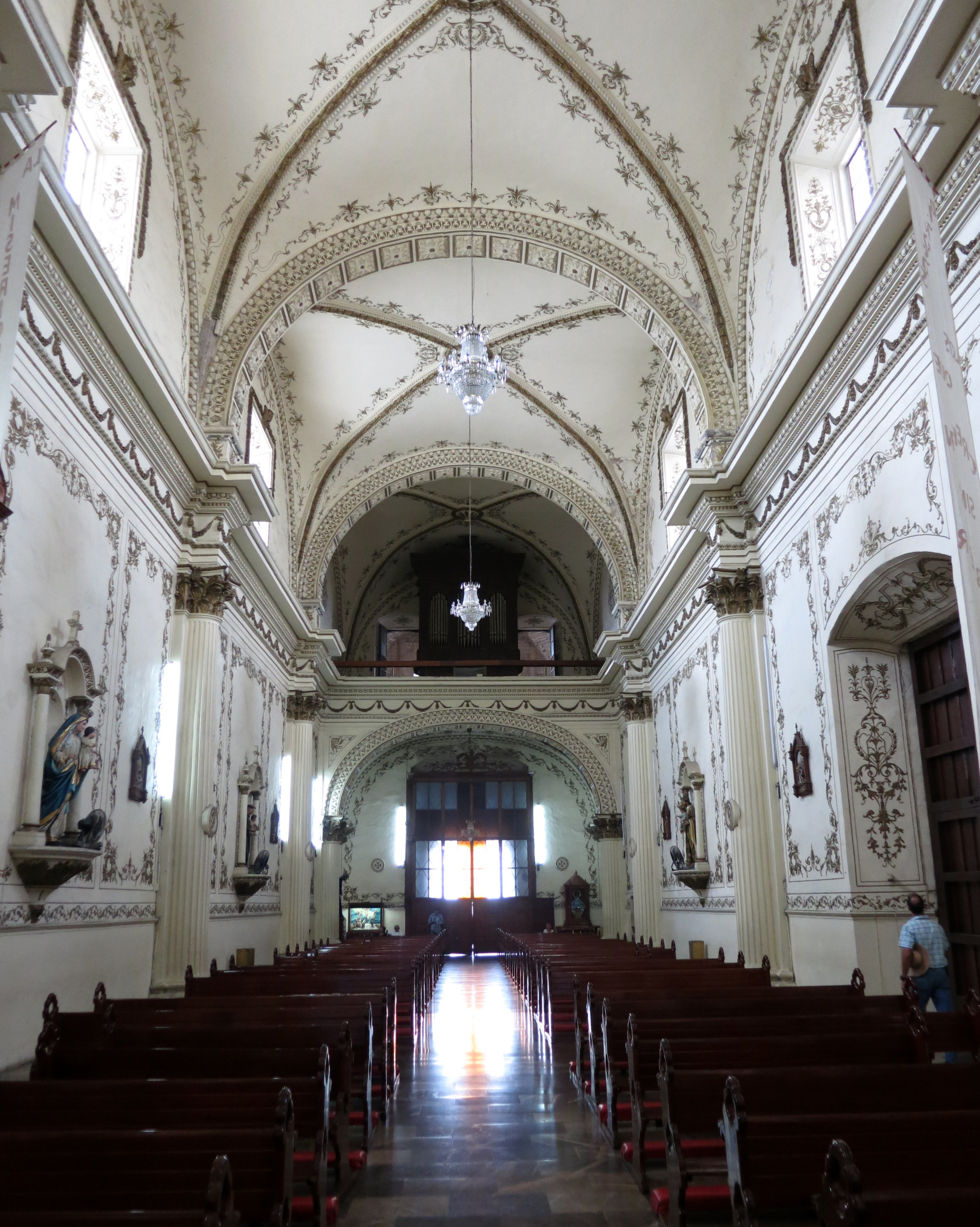
Internal view
