= Alfonso Humberto Robles Cota =

Mexican Roman Catholic bishop

- Bishop of Tepic
- Church: Catholic Church
- Diocese: Diocese of Tepic
- In office: 12 January 1981 – 21 February 2008
- Predecessor: Adolfo Suárez Rivera
- Successor: Ricardo Watty Urquidi

Orders
- Ordination: 30 October 1955 by Carlo Confalonieri
- Consecration: 1 March 1981 by Girolamo Prigione

Personal details
- Born: 30 October 1931 Los Mochis, Sinaloa, Mexico
- Died: 5 January 2017 (aged 85) Guadalajara, Jalisco, Mexico

Alfonso Humberto Robles Cota (30 October 1931 – 5 January 2017) was a Roman Catholic bishop.

Ordained to the priesthood in 1955, Robles Cota served as bishop of the Roman Catholic Diocese of Tepic, Mexico, from 1981 to 2008.

Robles Cota died in Guadalajara, Mexico on 5 January 2017.
