= Tepic =

- City
- City of Tepic
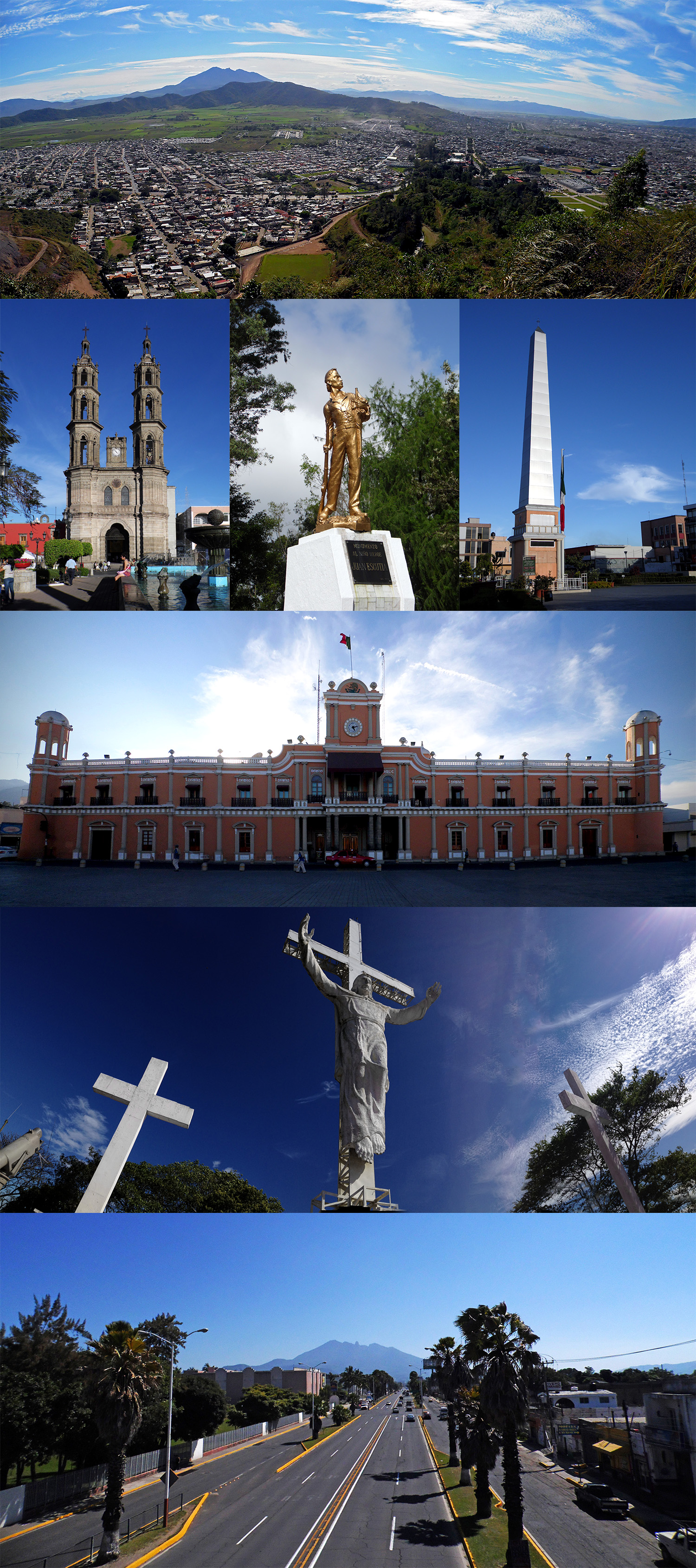
- Top: Panoramic view of Tepic and Sangangüey Volcano, from Santiago Hills. Second: Tepic Cathedral, Al Niño Heroe monument in Juan Escutia Park, Independent Obelisk in Bicentenario Square. Third: Tepic Government Palace. Fourth: A crucifix statue in Cruz Hills. Bottom: Tepic Technological Institute (Instituto Tecnológico de Tepic)

- Coat of arms

- Location in Mexico Tepic (Mexico)
- Coordinates: 21°30′30″N 104°53′35″W
- Country: Mexico
- State: Nayarit
- Municipality: Tepic
- Founded: November 18, 1531
- Founded as: Villa del Espíritu Santo de la Mayor España
- Founder: Nuño de Guzmán

Government
  - Municipal president: María Geraldine Ponce Méndez; Morena; PVEM; PT; Panal
  - Federal electoral district: Nayarit's 2nd

Area
  - Urban: 1,983 km^{2} (766 sq mi)
- Elevation: 920 m (3,020 ft)

Population (2020)
  - City: 371,387
  - Metro: 489,511
  - Demonym: Tepicense
- Time zone: UTC−07:00 (Zona Pacífico)
- Website: www.tepic.gob.mx

Tepic (Spanish pronunciation: [teˈpik]) is the capital and largest city of the western Mexican state of Nayarit, as well as the seat of the Tepic Municipality.

Located in the central part of the state, it stands at an altitude of 915 metres (3,002 ft) above sea level, on the banks of the Río Mololoa and the Río Tepic, approximately 225 kilometres (140 mi) north-west of Guadalajara, Jalisco. Nearby are the volcanoes of San Juan, Las Navajas, and Sangangüey. Tepic is the primary urban center of this rich agricultural region; major crops include sugarcane, tobacco and citrus fruits.

The city was founded in 1531 as Villa del Espíritu Santo de la Mayor España.

== Population ==
=== Indigenous population ===
Tepic has the second-largest indigenous population in the State of Nayarit, 4,375. The most prominent groups among them are the Huichol or Wixárika (3,276), Cora (527) and Purépecha (101).

=== Religion ===
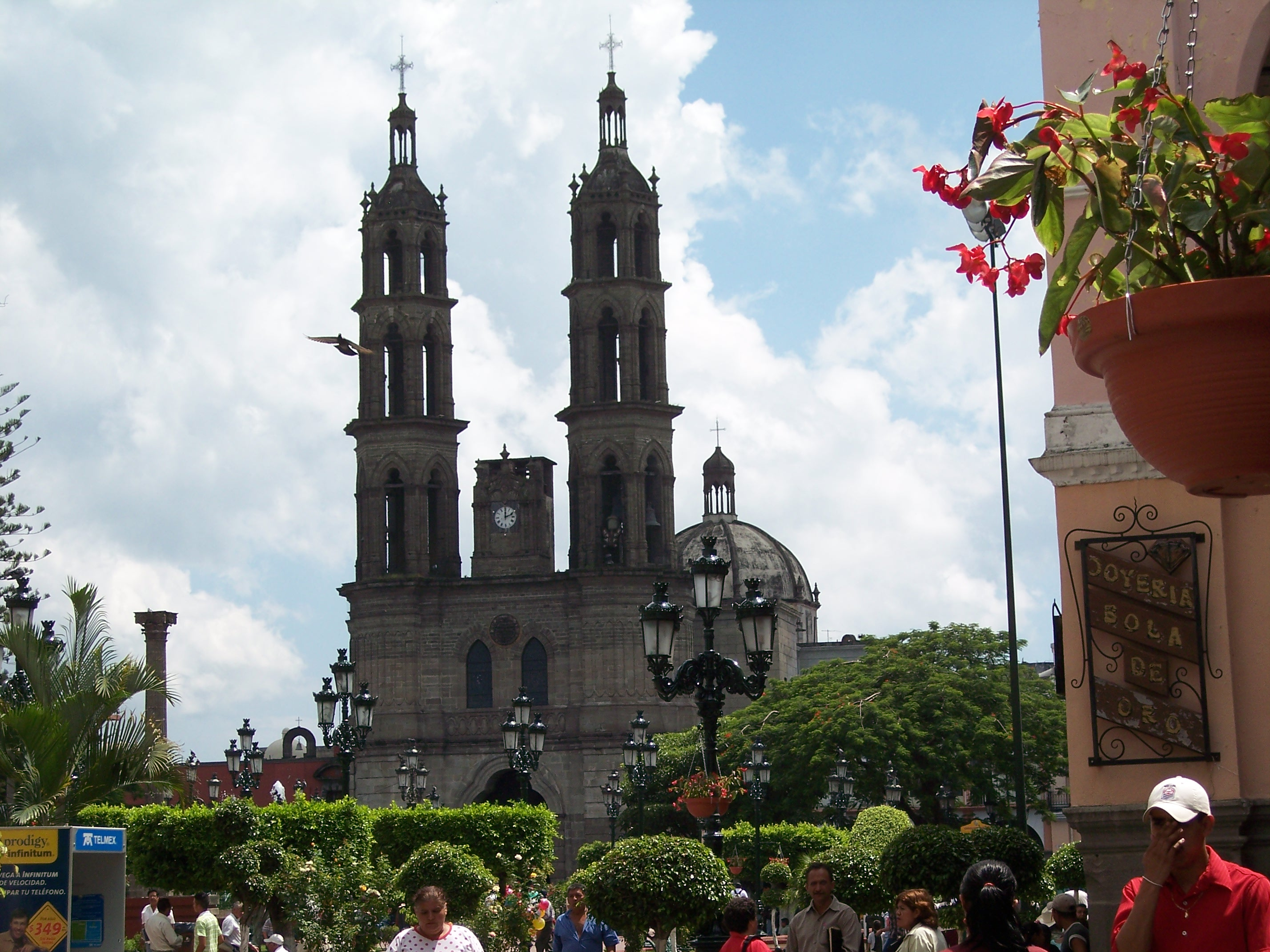
Cathedral of the Immaculate Conception

Catholicism is the most prominent religion in Tepic with 94.2% of the population. Its Catedral de la Purísima Concepción, dedicated to the Immaculate Conception, is the cathedral episcopal see of the Roman Catholic Diocese of Tepic, a suffragan see in the ecclesiastical province of the Archdiocese of Guadalajara.

== Notable people ==
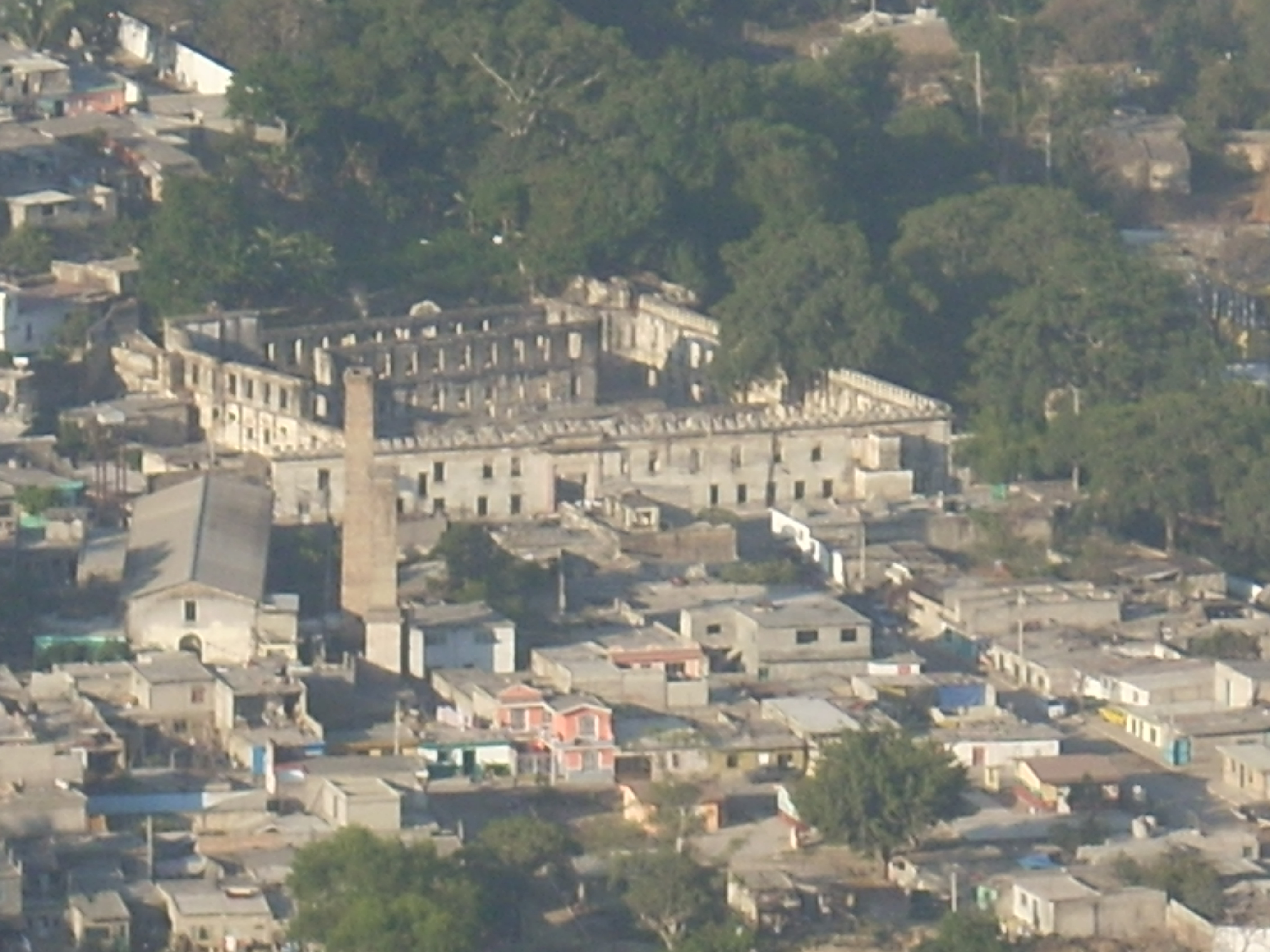
View of the ruins of Jauja

- Juan Escutia, Boy hero of the Battle of Chapultepec. Born in Tepic, between 1828 and 1832, on the morning of 13 September 1847, he fought to prevent invading U.S. forces from capturing Chapultepec Castle in Mexico City. After a brave defense, he is reported to have wrapped himself in the national flag and leaped to his death.
- Luis E. Miramontes, chemist, co-inventor of the first contraceptive pill
- Amado Nervo, poet and diplomat.
- Antonio Rivas Mercado, architect
- Emilia Ortiz, contemporary painter, caricaturist and poet, after whom the major downtown Centro de Arte Contemporaneo Emilia Ortiz has been named.
- Gustavo Ayón, NBA basketball player
- Francisco Guerrero, Mayor of San Francisco, 1836-1842.
- Luis Ernesto Franco, actor
- Joaquín Cosío, actor
- Tito Double P, singer-songwriter
- Manuel Lozada, caudillo

== Sports ==
Nayarit had small stadiums built for football and baseball. Both now demolished, there are plans to construct new, modern, and bigger stadiums; in 2025 Los Sultanes de Monterrey franchise of the Liga Arco Mexicana del Pacífico moved to Tepic and became Los Jaguares de Nayarit. They played their first game Estadio Coloso del Pacífico on October 15, 2025. The state has three sport private clubs. There are multiple football fields and places to play "cascaritas" (pick-up games), indoor football courts, a basketball center and gym (with wooden flooring), several volleyball courts, and a bowling alley. In addition to common sports, in the city's main park there is an olympic swimming pool and a squash field. In Tepic, tennis is a popular sport, but the most popular is football (soccer). Futsal is also commonly played in the city. The city also has a bullring, as do most Mexican cities. Tepic has several state teams, one or more for each sport. Both the football and the basketball teams are named "Coras".

== Geography ==
Located in the central part of the state, it stands at an altitude of 915 metres (3,002 ft) above sea level, on the banks of the Río Mololoa and the Río Tepic, approximately 225 kilometres (140 mi) north-west of Guadalajara, Jalisco. Nearby are the extinct Sangangüey volcano and its crater lake.

=== Climate ===
Tepic has a humid subtropical climate (Köppen climate classification Cwa), with most rain falling in the wet season from April to November, sometimes in December.

Climate data for Tepic (1951–2010)
| Month | Jan | Feb | Mar | Apr | May | Jun | Jul | Aug | Sep | Oct | Nov | Dec | Year |
|---|---|---|---|---|---|---|---|---|---|---|---|---|---|
| Record high °C (°F) | 31.5 (88.7) | 33.5 (92.3) | 34.5 (94.1) | 38.0 (100.4) | 35.0 (95.0) | 39.0 (102.2) | 37.5 (99.5) | 38.5 (101.3) | 35.2 (95.4) | 39.5 (103.1) | 36.0 (96.8) | 36.5 (97.7) | 39.5 (103.1) |
| Mean daily maximum °C (°F) | 24.6 (76.3) | 25.6 (78.1) | 26.8 (80.2) | 28.7 (83.7) | 30.0 (86.0) | 29.2 (84.6) | 28.2 (82.8) | 28.2 (82.8) | 28.0 (82.4) | 27.8 (82.0) | 27.1 (80.8) | 25.3 (77.5) | 27.5 (81.5) |
| Daily mean °C (°F) | 16.3 (61.3) | 16.6 (61.9) | 17.6 (63.7) | 19.4 (66.9) | 21.4 (70.5) | 23.3 (73.9) | 23.4 (74.1) | 23.3 (73.9) | 23.3 (73.9) | 21.9 (71.4) | 19.3 (66.7) | 17.5 (63.5) | 20.3 (68.5) |
| Mean daily minimum °C (°F) | 8.0 (46.4) | 7.6 (45.7) | 8.4 (47.1) | 10.1 (50.2) | 12.9 (55.2) | 17.4 (63.3) | 18.5 (65.3) | 18.5 (65.3) | 18.5 (65.3) | 16.0 (60.8) | 11.5 (52.7) | 9.7 (49.5) | 13.1 (55.6) |
| Record low °C (°F) | 1.5 (34.7) | −0.4 (31.3) | 1.0 (33.8) | 0.0 (32.0) | 5.5 (41.9) | 8.0 (46.4) | 12.5 (54.5) | 10.0 (50.0) | 11.0 (51.8) | 6.0 (42.8) | 4.0 (39.2) | 1.5 (34.7) | −0.4 (31.3) |
| Average precipitation mm (inches) | 29.5 (1.16) | 10.1 (0.40) | 7.4 (0.29) | 9.1 (0.36) | 8.9 (0.35) | 169.7 (6.68) | 378.6 (14.91) | 285.6 (11.24) | 221.5 (8.72) | 72.9 (2.87) | 17.5 (0.69) | 29.1 (1.15) | 1,239.9 (48.81) |
| Average precipitation days (≥ 0.1 mm) | 2.6 | 1.2 | 0.4 | 0.6 | 0.8 | 10.7 | 22.2 | 20.9 | 18.1 | 7.3 | 1.8 | 2.8 | 89.4 |
| Average relative humidity (%) | 68 | 66 | 64 | 62 | 65 | 73 | 78 | 79 | 79 | 76 | 71 | 69 | 71 |
| Mean monthly sunshine hours | 229 | 247 | 298 | 305 | 321 | 234 | 186 | 192 | 183 | 236 | 254 | 226 | 2,911 |
Source 1: Servicio Meteorológico Nacional (humidity 1981–2000)
Source 2: Ogimet (sun 1981–2010)

== Transport ==
Tepic is served by Tepic International Airport, with airlines from Canada, Mexico, and the U.S. flying into it.

== Twin towns – sister cities ==
- Havana, Cuba
- Paramount, California, United States
- Caborca, Sonora, Mexico
- Compostela, Nayarit, Mexico

== See also ==
- Tepic Territory

== Sources and external links ==
- Link to tables of population data from Census of 2005 INEGI: Instituto Nacional de Estadística, Geografía e Informática
- (in Spanish) Nayarit Enciclopedia de los Municipios de México
- (in Spanish) Official website (Ayuntamiento de Tepic)
