= Estadio del Bicentenario (Tepic) =

Multi-use stadium in Tepic, Mexico

- Location: Tepic, Mexico
- Capacity: 22,000 (football); 7,000 (baseball)

Construction
- Opened: September 2010
- Cost: $300 million

Estadio del Bicentenario is a multi-use stadium in Tepic, Mexico, that is under construction. Once completed in September 2010, it will be used mostly for football and baseball games . The football stadium was designed with a capacity of 22,000 spectators while the baseball stadium will have a capacity of 7,000 spectators. The construction of this stadium was cancelled and in the place a cultural complex will be constructed.
