= Diocese of Tepic =

Roman Catholic diocese in Mexico

Diocese of Tepic Dioecesis Tepicensis Diócesis de Tepic
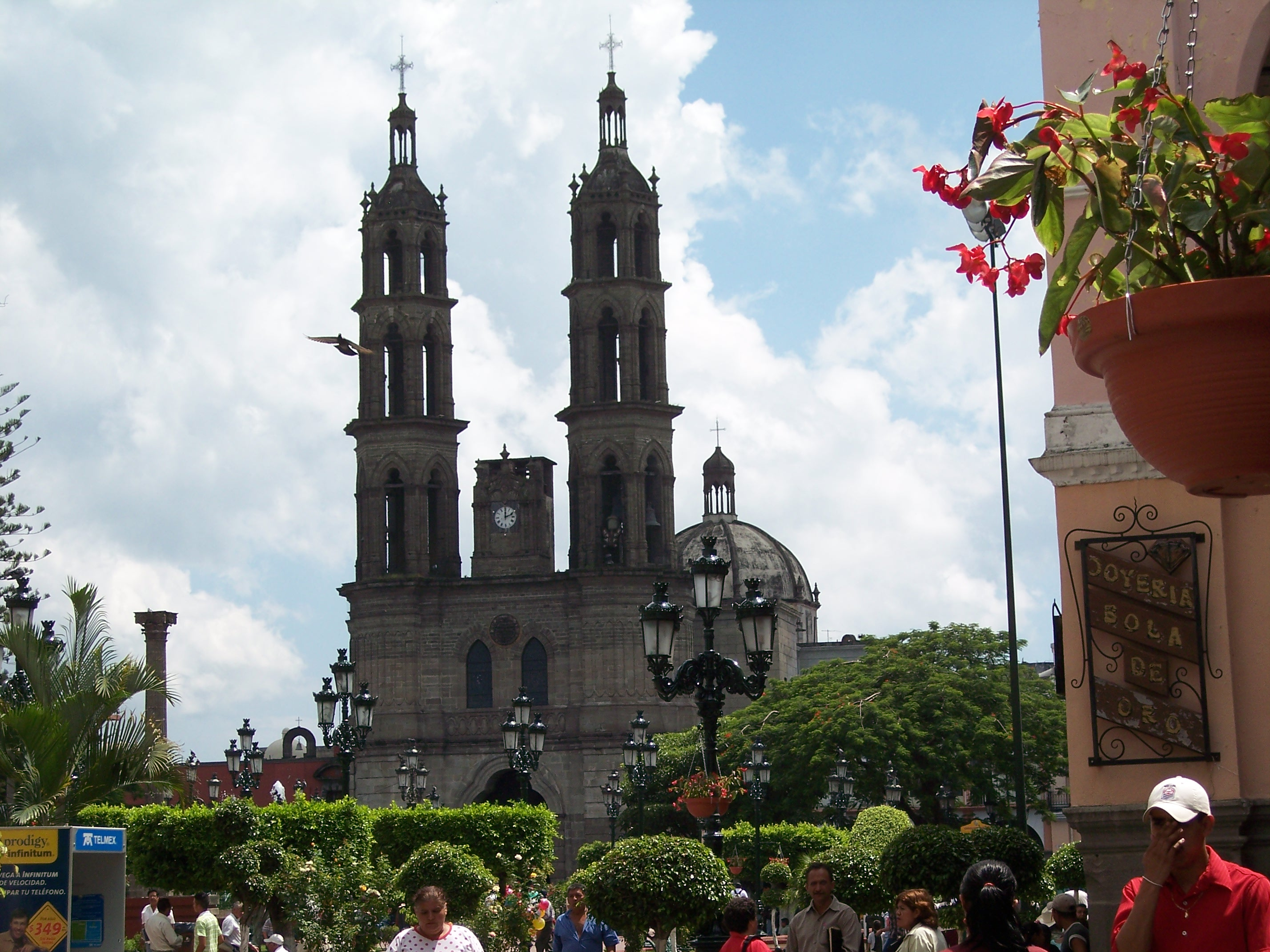
- Catedral de la Purísima Concepción

Location
- Country: Mexico
- Ecclesiastical province: Province of Guadalajara
- Metropolitan: Guadalajara
- Coordinates: 21°30′43″N 104°53′29″W

Statistics
- Area: 8,797 sq mi (22,780 km^{2})
- Population: Total; Catholics: (as of 2006); 1,139,584; 1,107,800 (97.2%)
- Parishes: 78

Information
- Denomination: Roman Catholic
- Rite: Roman Rite
- Established: 23 June 1891 (134 years ago)
- Cathedral: Cathedral of the Immaculate Conception

Current leadership
- Pope: Leo XIV
- Bishop: Engelberto Polino Sánchez
- Metropolitan Archbishop: Francisco Robles Ortega
- Bishops emeritus: Luis Artemio Flores Calzada

Map
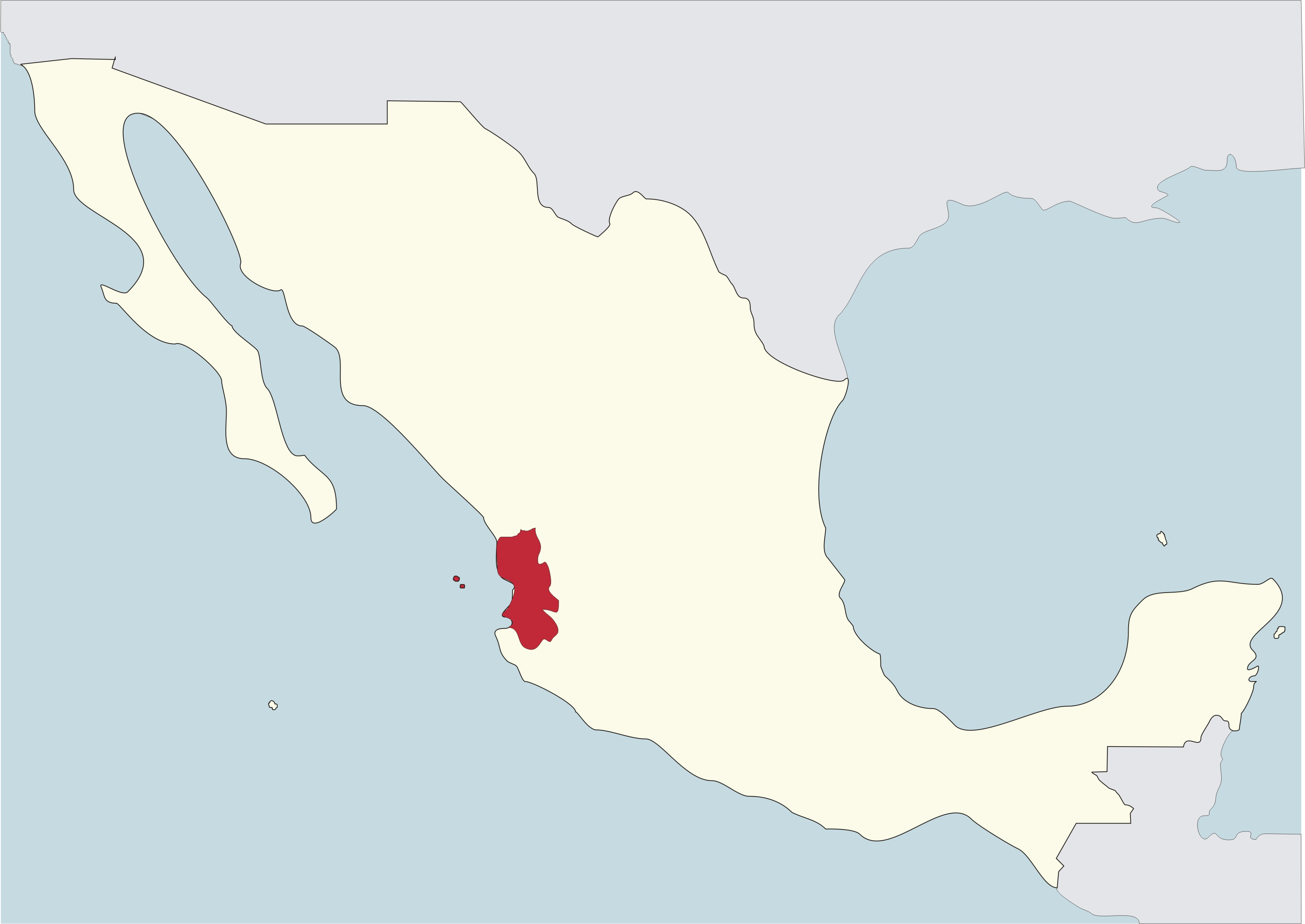

The Roman Catholic Diocese of Tepic (Latin: Dioecesis Tepicensis)) is a suffragan Latin diocese in the ecclesiastical province of the Metropolitan Archdiocese of Guadalajara in western Mexico.

Its cathedral episcopal see is the Catedral de la Purísima Concepción, dedicated to the Immaculate Conception, in Tepic, the capital of Nayarit state. It also has a Minor Basilica: Basílica de Nuestra Señora del Rosario de Talpa, dedicated to Our Lady of the Rosary, in Talpa de Allende, Jalisco.

== Statistics ==
As per 2014, it pastorally served 1,168,480 Catholics (88.1% of 1,325,985 total) on 22,777 km² in 92 parishes and 36 missions with 214 priests (207 diocesan, 7 religious), 205 lay religious (11 brothers, 194 sisters) and 54 seminarians.

== History ==
It was erected 23 June 1891 as Diocese of Tepic / Tepicen(sis) (Latin), on territory split off from its Metropolitan, the Archdiocese of Guadalajara.

== Bishops ==
(all Roman Rite)

=== Episcopal ordinaries ===
Suffragan Bishops of Tepic

- Ignacio Díaz y Macedo (1893.01.19 – death 1905.06.14)
- Andrés Segura y Domínguez (1906.08.06 – death 1918.08.13)
- Manuel Azpeitia Palomar (1919.08.10 – death 1935.03.01)
- Anastasio Hurtado y Robles (1935.12.21 – retired 1970.07.13)
- Adolfo Antonio Suárez Rivera (1971.05.14 – 1980.05.08), appointed Bishop of Tlalnepantla, México
- Alfonso Humberto Robles Cota (1981.01.12 – retired 2008.02.21)
- Ricardo Watty Urquidi, M.Sp.S. (2008.02.21 – death 2011.11.01)
- Luis Artemio Flores Calzada (30 March 2012 – retired 2025.08.28)
- Engelberto Polino Sánchez (2025.08.28 – Present)

=== Auxiliary bishop ===
- José Manuel Piña Torres (1958-1970), resigned

=== Other priests of this diocese who became bishops ===
- Mario Espinosa Contreras, appointed Bishop of Tehuacán, Puebla in 1996
- Jesús Antonio Lerma Nolasco, appointed Auxiliary Bishop of México, Federal District in 2009

== See also ==
- List of Catholic dioceses in Mexico
- Immaculate Conception Cathedral, Tepic

== Sources and external links ==
- GCatholic, with Google map and satellite photo - data for all sections
- Tehuantepec - Catholic Encyclopedia article
- "Diocese of Tepic". Catholic-Hierarchy.
