= Gustavo Rodríguez Vega =

Mexican prelate (born 1955)

- Archbishop of Yucatán
- Church: Catholic Church
- Archdiocese: Archdiocese of Yucatán
- Appointed: 1 June 2015
- Predecessor: Emilio Carlos Berlie Belaunzarán
- Other post: Apostolic Administrator of Cancún-Chetumal (2026)
- Previous posts: Bishop of Nuevo Laredo (2008-2015); Titular Bishop of Obba (2001-2008); Auxiliary Bishop of Monterrey (2001-2008)

Orders
- Ordination: 15 August 1980
- Consecration: 14 August 2001 by Adolfo Suárez Rivera

Personal details
- Born: 7 March 1955 (age 71) Monterrey, Nuevo León, Mexico
- Coat of arms

Gustavo Rodríguez Vega (born 7 March 1955) is a Mexican prelate of the Catholic Church who has been archbishop of Yucatán since 2015. He became a bishop in 2001, served for seven years as an auxiliary in Monterrey and seven years as bishop of Nuevo Laredo.

== Biography ==
Gustavo Rodríguez Vega was born in Monterrey, Nuevo León, on 7 March 1955, the son of Manuel Rodríguez Mora and Blanca Lilia Vega de Rodríguez. He entered the local seminary on 2 September 1970, completing his high school education and then his work in philosophy from 1973 to 1976 and in theology from 1976 to 1980. He was ordained a priest of the Archdiocese of Monterrey on 15 August 1980 by José de Jesús Tirado y Pedraza, Archbishop of Monterrey.

From 1980 to 1986, he worked first as prefect of discipline and studies at the diocese's minor seminary, then prefect and professor at the major seminary. From 1986 to 1986 he studied at the Pontifical Gregorian University, earning his licentiate in theology and the social doctrine of the Church. Returning to Monterrey, from 1989 to 1995 he served as director of the Archdiocesan Secretariat for Evangelization and Religious Instruction and director of the Bible School.

Pope John Paul II appointed him auxiliary bishop of Monterrey on 27 June 2001. He received his episcopal consecration on 14 August from Cardinal Adolfo Suárez Rivera, Archbishop of Monterrey.

He was the spokesperson of the Archdiocesan Commission for Pastoral Social Care from 2001 to 2006, and was twice elected the commission's president, serving from 2006 to 2012. He was the deputy representative of the Ecclesiastical Province of Monterrey before the President's Council of the Episcopal Conference of Mexico from 2006 to 2009.

On 8 October 2008, Pope Benedict XVI named him bishop of Nuevo Laredo. He was installed there on 19 November.

On 14 May 2015 he was elected president of the Commission on Social Pastoral Care of the Episcopal Conference of Latin America (CELAM).

On 1 June 2015, Pope Francis appointed him archbishop of Yucatán. He was installed there on 29 July.

On 9 November 2021, he was elected to a three-year term as vice president of the Episcopal Conference of Mexico.

In May 2023, Rodríguez Vega was elected president of Caritas Latin America and Caribbean.
