= Diocese of Nuevo Laredo =

Latin Catholic jurisdiction in Mexico

Diocese of Nuevo Laredo Dioecesis Novolaredensis Diócesis de Nuevo Laredo

Location
- Country: Mexico
- Ecclesiastical province: Province of Monterrey

Statistics
- Area: 7,484 sq mi (19,380 km^{2})
- Population: Total; Catholics: (as of 2004); 976,600; 791,000 (81%)
- Parishes: 34

Information
- Denomination: Catholic Church
- Sui iuris church: Latin Church
- Rite: Roman Rite
- Established: 6 November 1989 (36 years ago)
- Cathedral: Cathedral of the Holy Spirit

Current leadership
- Pope: Leo XIV
- Bishop: Luis Carlos Lerma Martínez
- Metropolitan Archbishop: Rogelio Cabrera López

Map
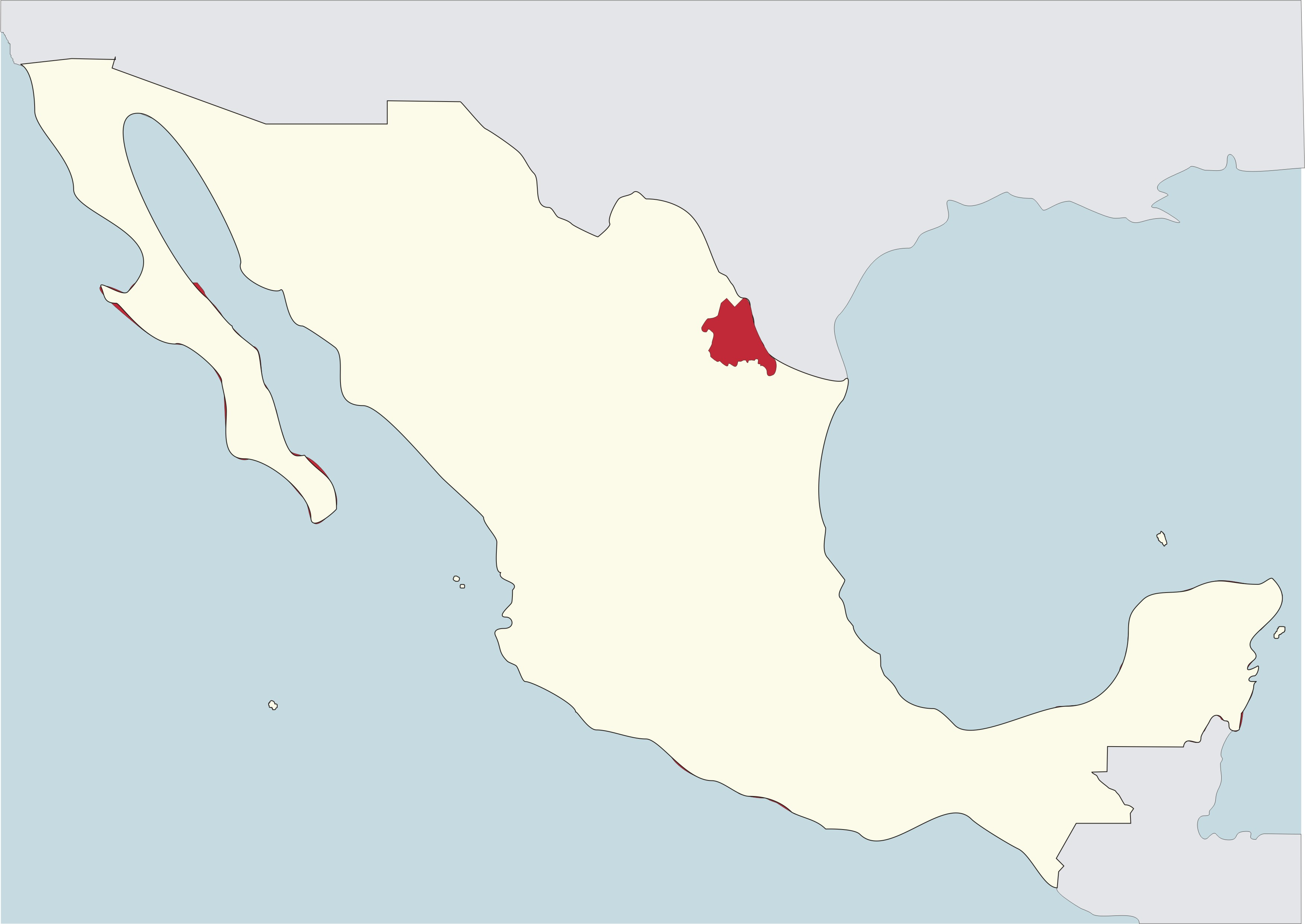

Website
- www.diocesisdenuevolaredo.org

The Diocese of Nuevo Laredo (Latin: Dioecesis Novolaredensis) is a Latin Church ecclesiastical territory or diocese of the Catholic Church in Nuevo Laredo, Tamaulipas, Mexico. It is a suffragan in the ecclesiastical province of the metropolitan Archdiocese of Monterrey. It covers an area of 7,484 Square Miles (19,378 square kilometers) and serves 980,000 inhabitants of which 86 percent are Catholic. The Diocese of Nuevo Laredo was erected on November 6, 1989 under the papal bull "quo Facilius." The current Bishop of Nuevo Laredo is Enrique Sanchez Martinez, who before coming to Nuevo Laredo in 2015 was the auxiliary bishop in the Diocese of Durango. His predecessor, Gustavo Rodriguez Vega, was called away from the diocese by Pope Francis to serve as Archbishop of Yucatán, which Archdiocese is based in Mérida.

== Bishops ==
- Ricardo Watty Urquidi, M.Sp.S. (1989–2008), appointed Bishop of Tepic, Nayarit
- Gustavo Rodríguez Vega (2008-2015), appointed Archbishop of Yucatán
- Enrique Sanchez Martinez (2015- )
- Luis Carlos Lerma Martínez (2025-Present)

== External links and references ==
- "Diocese of Nuevo Laredo". Catholic-Hierarchy.
