= Archaic period in Mesoamerica =

Prehistoric period in Mesoamerica

Archaic
- 8000 BCE – 2000 BCE
Lithic	Preclassic
- Location: Mesoamerica
- Monarch: None
- Leader: Unknown
- Key events: Sedentism; agricultural development; lithic tool development

The Archaic period, also known as the Preceramic period, is a period in Mesoamerican chronology that begins around 8000 BCE and ends around 2000 BCE and is generally divided into Early, Middle, and Late Archaic periods. The period is preceded by the Paleoindian (or Lithic) period and followed by the Preclassic period. Scholars have found it difficult to determine exactly when the Paleoindian period ends and the Archaic begins, but it is generally linked with changing climate associated with the transition from the Pleistocene to the Holocene epochs, and absence of extinct Pleistocene animals. It is also generally unclear when the Archaic period ends and the Preclassic period begins, though the appearance of pottery, large-scale agriculture, and villages signal the transition.

The Archaic period is traditionally viewed as a long, transitional interval between the hunter-gatherers of the Paleoindian period and the proliferation of agricultural villages in the Preclassic. This period is known for the domestication of major Mesoamerican crops, the development of agriculture, and the beginning of sedentism. The major developments in agriculture and sedentism during this time allowed for the rise of complex societies in the region. These developments were not uniform throughout Mesoamerica and often differed regionally.

Most Archaic sites are not very well preserved or visible, which hampers archaeologists' ability to discover and study Archaic period sites. As a result, not many Archaic sites have been identified, although major sites like Guilá Naquitz and Colha have been explored by archaeologists. Most known Archaic sites are in the Mesoamerican highlands or along the coasts, though there are sites throughout the region.

== Early sedentism ==
During the Archaic period, Mesoamerican peoples slowly changed from being nomadic hunter-gatherers to semi-sedentary or sedentary foragers and farmers. Based on research at sites on Mexico's gulf coast, central highlands, and coasts, it seems that people began settling in constructed, permanent villages between 3000 and 1800 BCE. These early villages are associated with the construction of perishable structures, use of agriculture, and participation in trade, especially obsidian trade. This change was gradual and differed by region. The earliest examples of this change are in temporary, seasonal shelters, such as Guilá Naquitz. Guilá Naquitz is a rock shelter in the Valley of Oaxaca that was occupied at least six times between 8000 and 6500 BCE by a largely nomadic band. Another rock shelter, El Gigante rock shelter in the Southern Highlands of Honduras, was occupied seasonally by largely mobile peoples in the Early and Middle Archaic periods. Based on the presence of specific plants, the rock shelter was inhabited during the wet season from July to September, then in the Archaic period, around 4700 BCE, from May to October.

Some of the earliest known villages appear along sea coasts, specifically the Chiapas and Caribbean coasts. It is likely that the abundant sea and lagoon resources could easily support long-term, year-round settlements, leading people to settle first in these areas. Shell mounds in these areas are highly visible, which likely aided in their identification by scholars. The earliest known coastal shell mound is Cerro de las Conchas, which dates between 5500 and 3500 BCE. Based on the limited diversity in artifacts and faunal remains, Cerro de las Conchas appears to have been a sea resource collection and processing site. While it seems Cerro de las Conchas was only occupied seasonally, it seems likely that inland base camps were occupied year-round. More permanent sites are identified in the archaeological record with greater frequency dating to 3000 BCE and later. The site of Zohapilco on Lake Chalco in the Basin of Mexico has evidence of year-round settlement before a volcanic eruption around 3000 BCE. The site of Colha and nearby swamps, such as Cobweb Swamp and Pulltrouser Swamp, show evidence of permanent settlement by 3000 BCE. Actun Halal, a rock shelter in Belize, was occupied as early as 2400 to 2130 BCE. Permanent villages are seen even later in the Valley of Oaxaca by 2000 BCE and in the Valley of Tehuacán by 1500 BCE. Based on these findings, it appears that people settled in resource-rich areas, such as along the coasts or by lakes, earlier than in semi-arid and arid environments like the Valleys of Oaxaca and Tehuacán. As agriculture developed, the population increased and settlements expanded into more marginal, less resource-rich areas.

== Development of agriculture ==
Increased reliance on domesticated plants and agriculture was gradual. Due to the diverse conditions, such as different soil types, rainfall, and terrain, it likely took thousands of years for people to adapt agricultural methods in Mesoamerica. This change in foodways began after the Younger Dryas when precipitation increased and the environment stabilized in the Holocene. The resources available to nomadic hunter-gatherers were likely changed by the change in climate, which drove peoples to adapt new means of acquiring food. While the change in climate was a catalyst for changes in food production, factors leading people to domesticate plants and develop agriculture is thought to be complex and multiple. Archaic peoples increased their use of domesticated plants, but still relied predominantly on foraging wild plants and hunting wild animals.

The earliest forms of horticulture and beginnings of domestication were likely versions of "dooryard horticulture" in which Archaic peoples used small plots nearby residential locations to plant and nurture a variety of plant species. As agriculture intensified and domesticated crops grew in importance, Archaic peoples began using slash-and-burn (also known as swidden) agriculture to clear large areas of land further from residential areas. Recovered stone tools, such as chipped stone adzes, appear to have been used to cut down trees and dig, suggesting that Archaic peoples were clearing the forest and cultivating the land. Paleoecological evidence, such as increased charcoal levels, decreased tree pollen levels, and increased maize pollen levels, indicates that maize and other crops were grown by slash-and-burn agriculture as early as 7300 BCE in the Central Balsas region and Caribbean coast of Mexico. Similar evidence of widespread forest clearing is seen starting around 5200 BCE on the Gulf coast and starting around 3500 BCE in the Maya Lowlands. Along the Chiapas coast, charcoal levels increased after 3500 BCE and remained high until 2600 BCE when people began abandoning coastal sites, which has been connected with forest clearing through burning. Across Northern Belize, paleoecological evidence indicates people began cultivating maize and manioc before 3000 BCE, but widespread forest clearance and increased maize cultivation began only after 2400 BCE. Later in the Archaic period and into the Preclassic, Mesoamerican peoples began adapting different agricultural methods, such as terracing, raised fields, and crop rotation, and using slash-and-burn methods less exclusively.

=== Domestication ===
Mesoamerica is one of the world's centers for the independent domestication of plants. As people became more sedentary, they became more reliant on particular plants. Specialized and intensive foraging techniques, such as selectively collecting larger seeds to plant and store, were part of the domestication process. Archaic peoples selected plants that could be easily stored and had a genetic makeup they could easily manipulate, such as maize (Zea mays), chili peppers (plants in the Capiscum genus), squash (Cucurbita pepo), and beans (plants in the Plaseolus genus). Cultivation of domesticated plants resulted in an increased and more reliable food supply for Archaic peoples, allowing an increase in population and settlements.

One of the most important crops to be domesticated was maize. Maize was an important domesticate for Mesoamerican people because it was very productive, easy to store, and nutritional. Genetic and molecular research has identified teosinte as the wild ancestor of maize. The domestication of teosinte is considered one of the most important developments in human life in Mexico and Central America. In addition, molecular evidence indicates that maize was domesticated once in the Balsas region, then spread to other nearby regions. Some of the earliest identified maize appears in Highland Mexico. Two maize cobs from the Guilá Naquitz rock shelter have been radiocarbon dated to 4300 BCE. Maize appears along the Chiapas coast by 3000 BCE, likely spread by trade. Based on the presence of maize pollen in swamps surrounding Colha around 3000 BCE, maize had also spread to Northern Belize by that time. Maize is also identified in the Mirador Basin nearby Nakbe in northern Guatemala by 2600 BCE and at Actun Halal in Central Belize by 2210 BCE.

Like maize, squash also was domesticated once then spread through trade, but other crops appear to have been domesticated multiple times by different groups of Mesoamerican peoples. Squash (Cucurbita pepo) was domesticated by 8000 BCE based on dated squash remains found in Guilá Naquitz. Bottle gourd (Lagenaria siceraria) also appears to have been domesticated around this time in the same area based on dated remains at the same site. Bottle gourd, however, was not a food source, but rather was used predominantly as a container. Stone tools from the Archaic period found in excavations around Freshwater Creek in Northern Belize were found to have remains of different varieties of maize, squash, beans, manioc (Manihot esculenta) and chili pepper on them, indicating that these plants had been domesticated by this time.

== Stone tools ==
Stone tool technologies, materials, and uses adapted and diversified during the Archaic period, especially in the Northern Belize Chert-Bearing Zone (NBCBZ) around the site of Colha. NBCNZ chert, also known as Colha chert, is incredibly high quality and distinct from chert originating in other regions. Colha chert became a common and important material for stone tools beginning around 3000 BCE and continuing into the Preclassic and Classic periods. Within Colha, archaeologists have discovered special-purpose workshops to manufacture constricted adzes, indicating the beginnings of economic specialization in stone tool production. Constricted adzes in the same style as those from Colha have been found throughout the region. These tools are predominantly bifacially worked from local chert. Constricted adzes were general-purpose tools used for woodcutting and digging, likely to clear forests and cultivate crops. Lowe and Sawmill points are other bifacially flaked stone tools found throughout Mesoamerica. These points were likely used in spears or harpoons to hunt and fish or used as hafted knives. These stone tools were finely flaked using a variety of techniques, such as hard and soft hammer flaking, direct pressure, and indirect percussion. Nearly all stone working techniques practiced in later periods are present and widespread in the Archaic period. Plant starch grains found on chipped-stone and ground-stone stone tools indicate the use of tools in processing plants, specifically in cutting and grinding plants.

=== Trade ===
Stone tools have been used to track possible trade networks throughout Mesoamerica. Little is known about trade in the Archaic period, but some evidence suggests the existence of local trade networks and some possible long-distance trade. Barbara Voorhies and her colleagues have argued that coastal Chantuto peoples in Southern Mexico traded for obsidian. In the Tlacuachero shell mound on the Chiapas coast, 57 obsidian flakes were discovered that seem to originate from highland Guatemala. Christine Niederberger suggests that sedentary peoples in the Basin of Mexico traded to obtain foreign green obsidian, rather than traveling to gather it directly from the source. In addition, Colha chert has been found outside of the Colha region, suggesting that trade networks may have developed around Colha chert.

== Important sites ==
=== Highlands ===
Many important Archaic sites are located within Highland Mexico, likely due to the early extensive research into the Archaic period by Richard MacNeish in the Valley of Tehuacán.

- Tehuacán Valley: Tehuacán Valley is located southeast of the Valley of Mexico and has been occupied over 10,000 years. The area was primarily surveyed and excavated by Robert MacNeish and his colleagues in the 1960s. While discoveries in the valley have been fundamental to the study of the Mesoamerican Archaic period, the radiocarbon dates are very controversial. Because archaeologists are skeptical of the accuracy of the radiocarbon dates and the integrity of stratigraphic levels, data and artifacts found in Tehuacán have been re-examined and re-analyzed many times. Within the valley, one major site is Coxcatlan Cave. Coxcatlan Cave contained 15 out of 33 Archaic period components found in MacNeish's survey, as well as 75% of the stone tools. Small maize cobs and remains of squash, chili peppers, beans, and bottle gourd have also been found in the cave.
- Valley of Oaxaca: Similar to the nearby Tehuacán Valley, the Valley of Oaxaca has been inhabited for over 10000 years. Archaeologists Kent Flannery and Joyce Marcus have conducted and overseen much of the work in this area. Within the valley, there are four major sites:

- Guilá Naquitz: Guilá Naquitz is a rock shelter located on the northern flanks of the valley and is the earliest of the sites. The site was excavated in 1966 and is the best documented site in the valley. It was temporarily occupied six times in the Early Archaic between 8000 and 6500 BCE. It contained 1716 pieces of chipped stone as well as some of the earliest known remains of domesticated maize, squash, and bottle gourd.
- Gheo-shih: Gheo-Shih is a large (1.5 hectare) open air site on the Mitla River floodplains below the Guilá Naquitz site. The site was occupied in the Middle Archaic from around 5000 to 4000 BCE. The site is known for a wide variety of stone artifacts including ground-stone tools, projectile points, butchering tools, and drilled stone pendants. There are also circular rock features that some have suggested may have been houses and two parallel lines of stones thought to have been a dance ground, ball court, or road.
- The Martínez Rock shelter
- Cueva Blanca

- Zohalpico: Zohalpico is a site at the edge of Lake Chalco in the Valley of Mexico. The site was excavated by Christine Niederberger in the 1960s and 1970s. Inhabitants of the site lived there year-round and used wild plants and animals, as well as domesticated maize and amaranth. The site was covered in ash during a volcanic eruption around 3000 BCE and was then reoccupied within the next century. After the volcanic eruption, the maize pollen density increased threefold and beans, gourds, and pumpkins appeared in the record.
- Santa Marta Cave: Santa Marta Cave is a site located in the Chiapas highlands in Mexico. The site was excavated by Richard MacNeish and Fredrick Peterson in 1959 then again in the 1970s by the Mexican National Institute of Anthropology and History. The site was occupied by hunter-gatherers until 3500 then abandoned until it is occupied again by farming peoples around 1300 BCE. The site contains teosinte and cacao pollen, as well as ground-stone tools.
- El Gigante rock shelter: El Gigante rock shelter is in the southern highlands of Honduras with excellent organic preservation. It was occupied seasonally and has storage pits. It was excavated in 2000 and 2001 and contains remains of wild plants and animals, as well as domesticated squash, though not maize.

=== Lowlands ===
- Chiapas coast: Six large shell mounds on the coastal plain are some of the earliest sites in the region. The area has been predominantly excavated and surveyed by Barbara Voorhies.

- Cerro de las Conchas: Cerro de las Conchas is the earliest of the Chiapas shell mounds, dating between 5500 and 3500 BCE. It is 3.5 m high and 100 m in diameter and located at the edge of the El Hueyate mangrove estuary. It was periodically occupied as a location to collect and process marine resources, especially clams and shrimp.
- Tlacuachero shell mound: Tlacuachero is also a shell mound that was seasonally occupied to gather and process marine resources, such as clams, fish, and turtles. 57 obsidian flakes have been found that seem to originate from highland Guatemala, suggesting there may have been trade networks. Two burials have been excavated at the site.

- Colha: Colha and other nearby sites, such as Cobweb Swamp, Pulltrouser Swamp, and Freshwater Creek, are located within the Northern Belize Chert-Bearing Zone and are important sites for chert starting in the Archaic period and continuing into the Preclassic and Classic period. The first permanent settlements at Colha begin around 3000 BCE and Colha remains settled in later periods. As a result, Colha has one of the best defined Late Archaic sequences and is useful in tracking changes from the Archaic period into the Preclassic.
- Actun Halal: Actun Halal is a 30 m long rock shelter in the Macal River Valley in Western Belize. The site was occupied from around 2400 to 1210 BCE. Constricted adzes and evidence of maize and cotton production have been found.
- Xihuatoxtla rock shelter: Xihuatoctla rock shelter is located on a tributary of the central Balsas River. The site dates between 6990 and 6610 BCE. Archaeologists have discovered 251 chipped-stone artifacts, as well as hand and milling stones.

== Connection to Maya Preclassic ==
It is generally unclear when the Archaic period ends and the Preclassic begins. There is no clear distinction between the food ways and tools of the Late Archaic and Early Preclassic. Based on the appearance of Maya ceramics at important Preclassic sites, the transition occurred roughly between 1200 and 800 BCE and differed by region.

Another issue is whether the Archaic peoples in the Maya region were the same people as in the Preclassic. There is little consensus on the nature, identity, or origins of the earliest Maya, which is complicated by disagreement about what constitutes Maya culture. Based on similarities in pottery styles, such as double-line breaks, similar slips, temper inclusions, and vessel forms, it was previously thought that the Maya lowlands were occupied by Mixe-Zoque speaking people migrating from the Isthmus of Tehuantepec. Terrence Kaufman suggested that the lowlands were populated by proto-Mayan speaking people from the highlands because Proto-Mayan languages split around 2200 BCE in the highlands and splinter groups appear in the lowlands around 1400 BCE. Others suggest, based on continuity in food ways and stone tool technologies, that Archaic populations in the lowlands developed or learned ceramic technologies and became the earliest Maya. Maya origin narratives from the Classic period describe fixing the beginning date of the Long Count calendar to a date in the Archaic period (3114 BCE) similar to the date of the beginnings of horticulture and domestication in the lowlands, indicating that the Maya themselves may have traced their origins to the Archaic period.

== See also ==
- Archaic period in North America
- Archaic period in Belize
