= Waru Waru =

South American type of raised field agriculture

Coordinates: 15°47′01″S 70°01′41″W

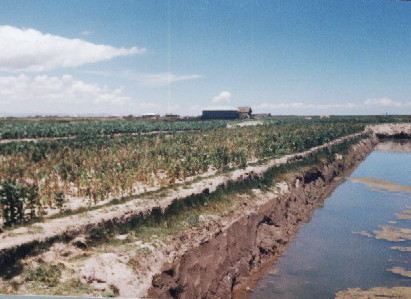
Modern example of a Waru Waru canal in Ilave, Peru

Waru Waru is a type of raised field agriculture developed by pre-Hispanic people in the Andes region of South America from Ecuador to Bolivia. This regional agricultural technique is also referred to as camellones in Spanish. Functionally similar agricultural techniques have been developed in other parts of the world.

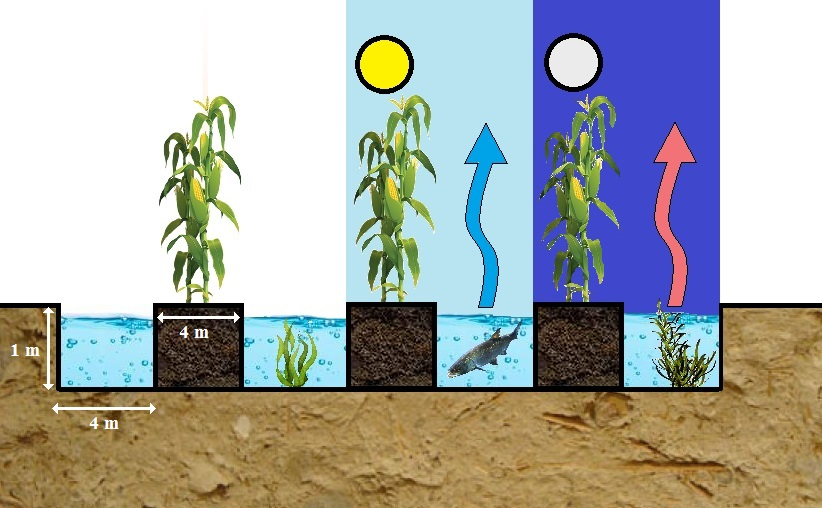
Diagram of the Waru Waru process

This type of altiplano field agriculture consists of parallel canals alternated by raised planting beds, which would be strategically located on floodplains or near a water source so that the fields could be properly irrigated. These flooded fields were composed of soil that was rich in nutrients due to the presence of aquatic plants and other organic materials. Through the process of mounding up this soil to create planting beds, natural, recyclable fertilizer was made available in a region where nitrogen-rich soils were rare. By trapping solar radiation during the day, this raised field agricultural method also protected crops from freezing overnight. These raised planting beds were irrigated very efficiently by the adjacent canals which extended the growing season significantly, allowing for more food yield. Waru Waru were able to yield larger amounts of food than previous agricultural methods due to the overall efficiency of the system.

This technique is dated to around 300 B.C., and is most commonly associated with the Tiwanaku culture of the Lake Titicaca region in southern Bolivia, who used this method to grow crops like potatoes and quinoa. This type of agriculture also created artificial ecosystems, which attracted other food sources such as fish and lake birds. Past cultures in the Lake Titicaca region likely utilized these additional resources as a subsistence method. It combines raised beds with irrigation channels to prevent damage by soil erosion during floods. These fields ensure both collecting of water (either fluvial water, rainwater or phreatic water) and subsequent drainage. The drainage aspect of this method makes it particularly useful in many areas subjected to risks of brutal floods, such as tropical parts of Bolivia and Peru where it emerged. Raised field agricultural methods have been used in many other countries such as China, Mexico and Belize. Mexican Chinampas were similar to Waru Waru in that they were created on or near a water source in order to properly irrigate crops. Raised fields are known in Belize from various sites, including Pulltrouser Swamp.

== Modern Uses ==
In the 1960s, geographers William Denevan, George Plafker, and Kenneth Lee found evidence of raised-field agriculture that had been utilized in the Llanos de Moxos region of Bolivia's Amazon basin, a region that was previously thought to have been unable to sustain large-scale agriculture because of what was believed to have been an unfavorable rainforest environment. This discovery led to a joint experimental archaeology project in the region involving archaeologist Clark Erickson, the Inter-American Foundation, the Parroquia of San Ignacio, the Bolivian Institute of Archaeology, and the University of Pennsylvania Museum of Archaeology and Anthropology. The goal of this experiment was to attempt to restore indigenous raised-field agriculture in the region. This project began in 1990 at the Biological Station of the Beni Department in Bolivia. Because of the experiment's success, it was later implemented further in collaboration with local indigenous communities. The indigenous community provided land for the project and the Inter-American Foundation paid them wages to build and maintain the plots, which successfully produced manioc and maize. These plots did not require extensive upkeep following the initial season's planting, and were self-sufficient because of the artificial ecosystems that they created.

This agricultural method was also revived by Alan Kolata of the University of Chicago in 1984, in Tiwanaku, Bolivia as well as Puno, Peru. Research on Waru Waru and its effectiveness in the past has led to a resurgence of the technique amongst contemporary Aymara- and Quechua-speaking native peoples in Bolivia and Peru. By utilizing this centuries-old technique, modern people in the region have been able to make use of the harsh altiplano landscape around Lake Titicaca. This method is now being used in different areas of South America where farming is difficult, such as the altiplano and the Amazon basin. Because of this method, indigenous people are now able to farm the landscape much more efficiently and without the use of modern equipment. This method also allows for large-scale agriculture to be performed in the Amazon basin without having to rely on deforestation.

=== Experiments ===
Research was done at two raised-field sites by Diego Sanchez de Lozada et al. in the northern altiplano of Bolivia near Lake Titicaca in an effort to better understand the effects of frost on potato crops. At an altitude of 3,810 m (12,500 ft), these crops were subject to temperature and moisture variation. Temperatures of the soil on top of the 50 cm (20 in) high raised mounds was about 1 degree Celsius higher than the temperature of the ground in nearby fields, showing that the raised-field technique was able to partially mitigate frost effects on potato crops at night. Temperature and moisture analysis of the raised fields showed that the higher temperature present was due to above-ground processes, which caused cold air to fall to the canals and not on the planted rows. The frost mitigation effects of the raised field system kept crops from freezing overnight, which increased crop yield.

== History ==
=== Lake Titicaca Region ===
16th Century Spanish accounts of the Lake Titicaca region mentioned the different types of agriculture utilized by the native peoples in detail, however there was never any mention of raised fields in their records. The lack of Spanish accounts strongly suggests that these Waru Waru were no longer in use by the time the conquistadors reached the Lake Titicaca region.

The raised fields of the region are numerous and range in size, however they are generally 4 to 10 m (13 to 33 ft) wide, 10 to 100 m (33 to 328 ft) long, and 1 m (3.3 ft) tall. These pre-Hispanic fields cover about 82,000 ha (200,000 acres) of land in Bolivia and Peru, and sit above an altitude of around 3,800 m. Radiocarbon dates taken from habitation sites associated with raised field agriculture in the region indicate usage sometimes between 1000 B.C. to A.D. 400. Thermoluminescence dating was also used to date pottery shards in associated areas, the results of which agree with the radiocarbon dates. Field stratigraphy was used to provide relative dates of the usage of certain raised fields in the area. The habitation sites in association with these fields indicate large populations and long-term occupations, suggesting that raised field agriculture was able to sustain large numbers of people. These dates provided from Andean sites suggest that this form of agriculture was a relatively early phenomenon in the area that slowly expanded throughout the region, and was utilized by various cultures during different time periods.

== See also ==
- Chinampa
