= Los Teteles de Ávila Castillo =

Archaeological Site in Mexico

Los Teteles de Ávila Castillo, Los Cerritos, or Tetelictic is an archaeological site in the state of Puebla, Mexico. The site was formed during the Middle Formative Period (600 BC).

== The Site ==
Tetelictic may have served as an astronomical observatory for agriculture cycles as the pyramids are in an aligning with nearby mountain ranges.

There have been three pyramidal structures discovered, with ceramics, lithics, and carved objects from Obsidian and Basalt. The largest structure in the site, titled "Structure 1", has an alignment with Canopus which is the brightest star in the constellation of Carina.

The archaeological site has a large amount of Obsidian flakes that have been discovered, which is an indicator of an Obsidian industry in the area and an industry for the manufacturing of weaponry.
