= Preceramic period in Belize =

Historical period in Belize, to 2000 BC

Coordinates: 17.0°N 88.5°W

Preceramic
- 20000 BC – 2000 BC
None	Preclassic
- Location: Belize
- Including: Palaeoindian (to 8000 BC); Archaic (to 2000 BC)
- Key events: Palaeoindian settlement; lithic tool development; introduction of farming

The Preceramic period of Belizean and Mesoamerican history began with the arrival of the first Palaeoindians during 20000 BC – 11000 BC, and ended with the Maya development of ceramics during 2000 BC – 900 BC. (Note: The Preceramic period is variously dated in literature (see Periodisation of the history of Belize for further discussion). For instance, it is dated 11500 BC – 900 BC by Stemp et al. 2021, pp. 416–417, 20000 BC – 2000 BC or 12000 BC – 2000 BC by Sharer & Traxler 2006, pp. 98, 153–154, 35000 BC – 1500 BC or 10000 BC – 1500 BC by Adams & Macleod 2000a, p. 10, 35000 BC – 2300 BC by Pearsall 2008, pp. 163–164. However, Stemp et al. 2021, p. 417 note that ceramics in northern and central Belize have been dated to circa 1200 BC, such that an end period of 900 BC for the Preceramic 'may be too recent.' Additionally, Adams & Macleod 2000a, p. 47 note that 2300 BC 'marks the end of the Preceramic era and, by strict definition, the close of the Archaic[; however, s]ome prehistorians reason that the Archaic period in Mesoamerica should more logically be extended to 1500 [BC], when the transformation from nomadic foraging to a fully sedentary, agricultural way of life was essentially complete throughout the area.' Pearsall 2008, p. 163 similarly note that '[b]y 2300 [BC] pottery was being manufactured in [Mesoamerica], by which definition marks the end of the Preceramic era and its final Archaic period[; s]ome archaeologists, however, prefer to extend the Archaic to 1500 [BC] or later, by which time agriculture provided the bulk of food and the previously nomadic hunter-gatherers had settled in permanent villages.') (Note: The term Lithic period is sometimes used as a synonym for the Preceramic period proper (as in Pearsall 2008, p. 163 and Adams & Macleod 2000a, p. 46), and at other times as a synonym for the Palaeoindian subperiod of the Preceramic period (as in Sharer & Traxler 2006, p. 98).)

== Geography ==
During the pre-Columbian era, Belize formed part of Mesoamerica. Traditionally, the first-order subdivisions of the latter follow cultural or political boundaries of Preclassic, Classic, or Postclassic civilisations, eg Mayas and Aztecs. The Maya Region of Mesoamerica is one such. It, in turn, is further subdivided physiographically into at least three regions, ie the Lowlands, the Highlands, and the Pacific. Belize lay within the first of these regions, usually termed the Maya Lowlands.

== Climate ==
During the Younger Dryas stage, as the Pleistocene progressed to the Holocene epoch, Belize's climate became increasingly warmer and wetter, its expansive savannah fields increasingly covered by dense tropical broadleaf forests, and its low-lying coast submerged by a 10 ft (3 m) rise in sea levels. It is not certain how exactly the first Palaeoindian settlers adapted to such changes, as little Preceramic plant matter has been recovered in the country and surrounding Maya Lowlands. It has been suggested, however, that the increasing availability of small, freshwater food-sources, eg molluscs, turtles, and aquatic birds, which attended wetter climatic conditions during the early Holocene, may have driven a slow transition away from a diet heavily reliant on large game towards a broader-spectrum or varied diet incorporating various species of small game and aquatic food-sources.

== Demographics ==
Few skeletal findings in Belize and the broader central Maya Lowlands have been dated to the Preceramic, resulting in limited understanding of the period's demographics. Remains recovered from caves across the Yucatan Peninsula have been reliably dated to 13000 BC – 12000 BC, such findings constituting the earliest available evidence of human presence in the Lowlands. Genetic studies of Yucatanese remains, and of Lowland remains generally, have tended to confirm demographic models involving multiple migrations from North and South America into the Maya Lowlands. For instance, recent genetic studies on Preceramic skeletal remains from southern Belize found common ancestry between these and Preceramic proto-Chichban speakers from the Panama–Colombia region, indicating that the latter settled in southern Belize during 5500 cal BC – 3600 cal BC, and intermixed with pre-existing Palaeoindian residents. Further studies also found common ancestry between this population and modern Mayas, suggesting that later Maya settlers of Belize intermixed with pre-existing Palaeoindian residents. Generally, however, Palaeoindians in Belize and the Lowlands are not thought to be direct ancestors of later Mayas, the implication being that the latter did not intermix with the former upon settlement. (Note: What we can take from this [recent genetic studies on Preceramic skeletal remains from southern Belize] is support for the old conclusion that the fluted Clovis and Fishtail [lithic projectile point] traditions of North, Central, and South America were related. Moreover, this technology may have spread as the descendants of one group of early Paleaoindians migrated south through the New World. Among these were the earliest inhabitants of the SBR [Southern Belize Region, in Toledo] dating to the end of the Pleistocene. But these early occupants left an ever-attenuating genetic footprint, either as it was selected against or, much more likely, as later groups arrived. Thus, the much later inhabitants of the SBR and the Maya Area [of Mesoamerica] as a whole may have had some relationship with the Paleoindians of the region 10 millennia earlier, but that relationship probably was quite distant and likely dates to a time before the first Paleoindians left North America and arrived in what today is Belize. Put another way, the genetic evidence that the Maya are direct descendants of the Paleoindians of Central America is very slim and much more strongly suggests that they represent a later migration that, unfortunately, has not yet been dated. — Braswell 2022, p. 92.)

== Technology ==
=== Lithic ===
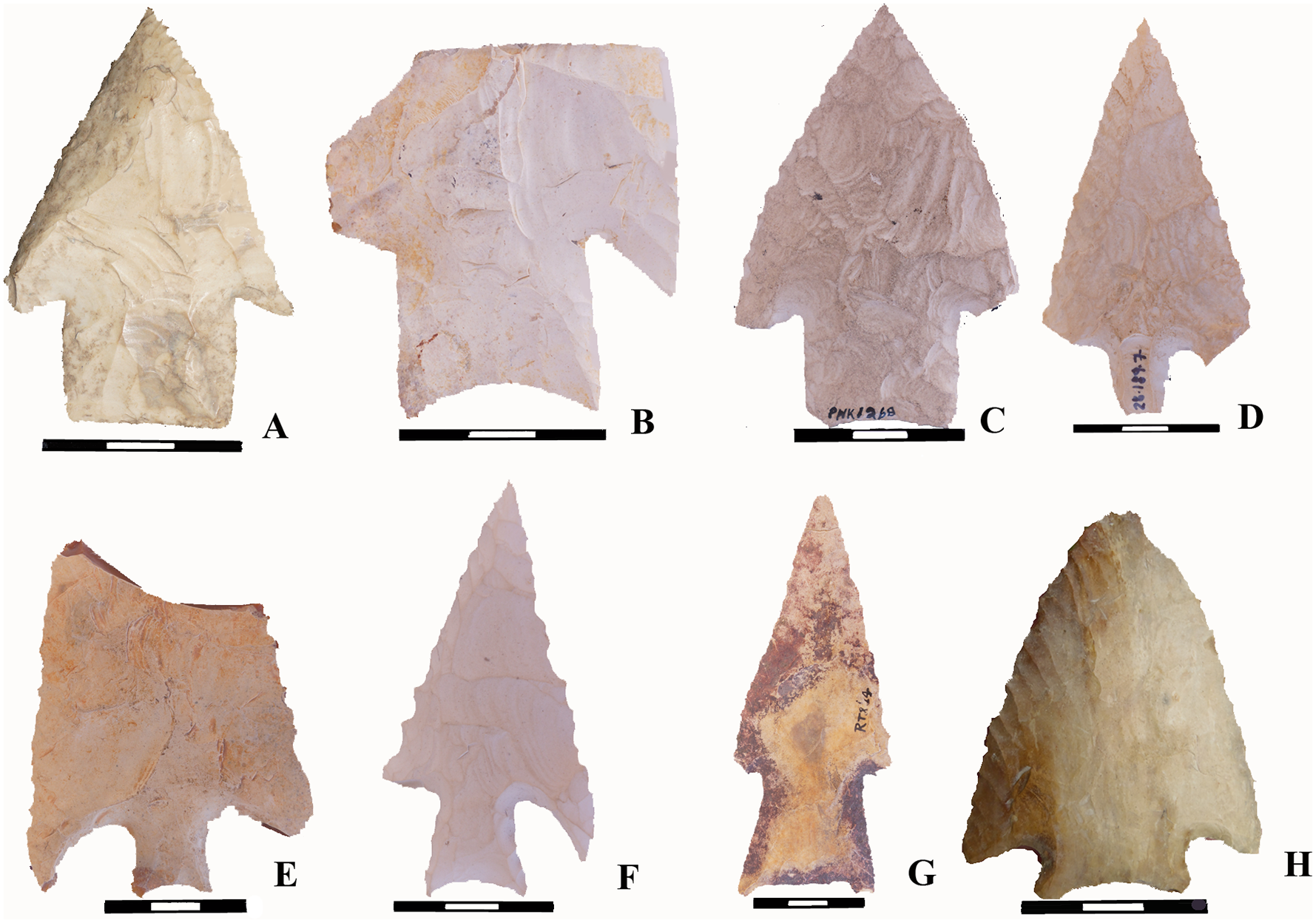
Preceramic projectile points from Belize / A–C Lowe / D–F Sawmill / G Allspice / H Ya'axche / 2019 Prufer et al. / via PLOS ONE

Lithic technology during the first part of the Preceramic is characterised mainly by Clovis-style, ie fluted, lanceolate and Fell's Cave-style, ie fluted fishtail, bifaces. Bifaces recovered from Belize and the Maya Lowlands, however, can seldom be reliably radiocarbon dated. A recent exception to this was provided by excavations in Mayahak Cab Pek and Tzibte Yux, rock shelters in southern Belize, which yielded radiocarbon dates of 10450 cal BC – 10085 cal BC and 8275 cal BC – 6650 cal BC for one alternately-bevelled biface and three or four possibly Lowe-style stemmed bifaces, respectively. The relationship of these radiocarbon-dated bifaces to others recovered in Belize is not clear. In particular, it is thought that Sawmill-, Allspice-, and Ya'axche-style bifaces may predate the aforementioned ones, but this conjecture remains unconfirmed.

Bifaces seem to have been phased out in most of Belize and the surrounding Maya Lowlands by around 6000 BC, with non-bifacial lithic tools replacing them by around 3400 BC.

In 1983, the Belize Archaic Archaeological Reconnaissance Project (BAAR) proposed a six-phase classification of lithic technology as found in northern Belize. This classification was subsequently criticised and rejected, being described as "so badly flawed that the resulting chronology has little merit". An alternative six-phase classification has since been proposed.

Phases or types of Preceramic bifacial points recovered in Belize (Stemp et al. 2021, supp. 1) Excluding over 130 constricted unifaces ie adzes recovered from Belize; counts as of 2021 Dimensions given in mean millimetres; data exclude 'significantly damaged bifaces'
Phase	Status	Origin	Count	Form	Length ( max)	Width (max)	Width (neck)	Thickness (max)	Notes
Allspice	Provisional	Local	4	Stemmed	85.7	37.8	33.2	10.7	cf (Note: Form and Count from Stemp et al. 2021, supp. 1. No associated radiocarbon dates, though 'may be younger than Lowe and Allspice points, based on the observed differences in patination and style of artifacts when all are found in the same area' (Kelly 1993, p. 216).)
Clovis	Established	North America	3	Fluted	71.6	31.0	26.6	7.2	cf (Note: Form from Stemp et al. 2021, p. 418. Count from Stemp et al. 2021, p. 419. Associated radiocarbon dates not available (Stemp et al. 2021, p. 419). Points recovered from Ladyville and August Pine Ridge (Stemp et al. 2021, supp. 1). American Clovis points adequately dated 11300 – 10600 BP, such that '[o]ne can only postulate a date for [Clovis points from Ladyville] of ca. 10,000 b.c. with a potentially large probable error' (Kelly 1993, p. 224).)
Fishtail	Established	South America	4	Fluted	63.2	43.7	25.3	7.1	cf (Note: Form from Stemp et al. 2021, p. 418. Count from Stemp et al. 2021, p. 419. Associated radiocarbon dates not available (Stemp et al. 2021, p. 419). Points recovered from New River Lagoon, Orange Walk [Town], Big Falls [on Rio Grande], and Lowe Ranch (Stemp et al. 2021, supp. 1).)
Lowe	Established	Local	63	Stemmed	83.5	55.6	29.0	9.8	cf (Note: Form and Count from Stemp et al. 2021, supp. 1. Dated 2500 BC – 1900 BC by Kelly 1993, pp. 215, 224, among others (Braswell 2022, p. 90). Dated to 8200 cal BC – 7300 cal BC more recently, at least for Lowe points recovered in southern Belize (Braswell 2022, pp. 90–91, Awe et al., p. 529).)
Sawmill	Established	Local	23	Stemmed	67.9	39.4	14.9	7.8	cf (Note: Form and Count from Stemp et al. 2021, supp. 1.)
Ya'axche	Provisional	Local	2	Stemmed	65.7	52.8	29.9	10.9	cf (Note: Form and Count from Stemp et al. 2021, supp. 1.)

=== Other ===
Evidence of Preceramic weaving, eg cordage, sandals, baskets, nets, and bags, has been recovered across Mesoamerica, though not in Belize. It has been suggested that their absence in the country is rather due to poor preservation of organic material, rather than due to a lack of weaving by Palaeoindian settlers.

== Subsistence ==
The diet of the first Palaeoindian settlers has not been fully elucidated. Faunal remains from Actun Halal in southern Belize suggest these early settlers consumed jute snails, horses, peccaries, common agouti, and spectacled bears. Floral and faunal evidence from the El Gigante rockshelter in Honduras suggests their diet included hog plums, pears, mammee apples, mesquite beans, acorns, deer, birds, turtles, crabs, and snails. Similar evidence from the Santa Marta rockshelter in Chiapas suggests the likely consumption of green tomatoes, craboo, figs, deer, peccary, rabbits, snakes, iguanas, tortoises, and jute snails, and the possible consumption of cacao and teosinte.

The early settlers are thought to have begun farming by circa 4500 BC, with the practice becoming increasingly common by circa 3400 BC. Floral remains from northern and central Belize suggest maize, cassava, chilis, squash, and beans were the main cultivars, these being increasingly relied upon for nutrition during 3000 BC – 1500 BC. This increasing reliance on farmed produce is thought to have resulted in forest disturbance, deforestation, and landscape modification. (Note: However, carbon and nitrogen isotopes in bone collagen and bone apatite from human skeletal remains from southern Belize indicate that the diet in this area did not include maize prior to circa 2750 cal BC (Stemp et al. 2021, p. 421, Braswell 2022, p. 92). Additionally, faunal remains from northern Belize indicate that a wide array of game were still being hunted during 3400 BC – 900 BC, including common agouti, armadillo, snakes, turtles, freshwater fish and molluscs, and possibly white-tailed deer (Stemp et al. 2021, pp. 421–422).)

== Sites ==
Preceramic sites in Belize and surrounding Lowlands / very large Classic sites outside of Belize displayed / Uxmal+ = Uxmal, Tiho / Caye Coco+ = Caye Coco, Betz Landing, Fred Smith / via 2010 Witschey & Brown, 2021 Stemp et al.

Preceramic artefacts have been recovered mainly from northern and central Belize. Preceramic findings in southern Belize 'had been suspiciously absent' since the 1980s, being limited to a few surface finds until quite recently. Generally, few Preceramic living spaces have been identified in the Maya Lowlands. Seven Preceramic sites in Belize have been recently proposed as such, ie Saki Tzul, Mayahak Cab Pek, Tzibte Yux, Actun Halal, Caye Coco, Ladyville, and Xunantunich. An additional four have been recently proposed as working spaces, eg as lithic workshops, namely, Colha, Kelly, Ladyville, and Callar Creek.

Prominent excavated sites in Belize with Preceramic artefacts, material, or structures. (Note: Not including various unnamed or minor Preceramic sites.)
Name	Location	Size
Actun Halal	Cayo	Small
August Pine Ridge	Orange Walk	Small
Basil Jones	Ambergris Caye	Small
Betz Landing	Corozal	Small
Blackman Eddy	Cayo	Small
Blue Creek	Orange Walk	Small
Cahal Pech	Cayo	Large
Callar Creek	Cayo	Small
Caye Coco	Corozal	Small
Cayo Frances Lagoon	Ambergris Caye	Small
Cob Swamp	Corozal	Small
Cobweb Swamp	Corozal	Small
Colha	Corozal	Small
Crawford Bank	Belize	Small
Cuello	Corozal	Small
Fred Smith	Corozal	Small
Honey Camp Lagoon	Orange Walk	Small
Kelly	Belize	Small
Ladyville	Belize	Small
Lowe Ranch	Belize	Small
Mayahak Cab Pek	Toledo	Small
Pulltrouser Swamp	Corozal	Small
Saki Tzul	Toledo	Small
Sand Hill	Belize	Small
Tzibte Yux	Toledo	Small
Xunantunich	Cayo	Large

== Timeline ==
Prominent Preceramic events in Belize or the Maya Lowlands.
Start	End	Unit	Event	Notes
13000	12000	BC	Earliest appearance of Palaeoindians	cf (Note: As of 2022, the earliest Preceramic skeleton recovered in the Lowlands is that of Naia of Hoyo Negro, dated to 12910 cal BP – 12720 cal BP; the earliest recovered in Belize is that of an unnamed individual of Mayahab Cab Pek, dated 9430 cal BP – 9140 cal BP (Tiesler 2022, p. 50, table 1.3.1).)
10450	10085	cal BC	Earliest appearance of bifaces	ie an alternately-bevelled point; cf
7000	7000	BC	Latest appearance of Ice Age megafauna	including horses; cf
7000	6000	BC	Latest appearance of bifaces	cf (Note: As of 2019, no bifaces recovered in Belize have been dated to 7000 BC – 1900 BC, though it is uncertain whether this represents a gap in contemporary knowledge or one in Preceramic lithic production ie whether this temporal gap indicates an absence of evidence or evidence of an absence (Awe et al. 2021, p. 529).)
4500	4500	BC	Earliest appearance of domesticated plant cultivars	cf
3400	3400	BC	Earliest appearance of lithic tools other than bifaces	ie blades, macroblades, pointed unifaces; cf
2500	1500	BC	Earliest appearance of intensified agriculture	ie deforestation, erosion; cf
2200	1900	BC	Drought	cf

== Scholarship ==
The earliest work on Preceramic artefacts from Belize is thought to be that of Augustus Pitt Rivers, who exhibited a flint implement for the Society of Antiquaries of London on 2 March 1871, which had been recovered from the country 'some years ago' by a Royal Navy officer. The discovery, however, did not spark much interest, as work in the region focussed on Classic Period sites and artefacts.

The first significant work was that of the Belize Archaic Archaeological Reconnaissance Project (BAAR), begun in 1980. BAAR identified some 150 possibly Preceramic sites across the country, and conducted excavations in nine of these, all in northern Belize.

== See also ==
- Pre-Columbian Belize
- Lithic stage in the Americas
- Archaic stage in the Americas
- Palaeoindian Period in Mesoamerica
- Archaic Period in Mesoamerica

== Notes and references ==
=== References ===
==== Journals ====
1. Akers, Pete D.; Brook, George A.; Railsback, L. Bruce; Liang, Fuyuan; Iannone, Gyles; Webster, James W.; Reeder, Philip P.; Cheng, Hai; Edwards, R. Lawrence (1 October 2016). "An extended and higher-resolution record of climate and land use from stalagmite MC01 from Macal Chasm, Belize, revealing connections between major dry events, overall climate variability, and Maya sociopolitical changes". Palaeogeography, Palaeoclimatology, Palaeoecology. 459: 268–288. Bibcode:2016PPP...459..268A. doi:10.1016/j.palaeo.2016.07.007.
2. Awe, Jaime J.; Ebert, Claire E.; Stemp, W. James; Brown, M. Kathryn; Sullivan, Lauren A.; Garber, James F. (2021). "Lowland Maya Genesis: The Late Archaic to Late Early Formative Transition in the Upper Belize River Valley". Ancient Mesoamerica. 32 (3): 519–544. doi:10.1017/S0956536121000420. S2CID 245125325.
3. Cagnato, Clarissa (2021). "Gathering and Sowing Across the Central Maya Lowlands: A Review of Plant Use by Preceramic Peoples to the Early to Middle Preclassic Maya". Ancient Mesoamerica. 32 (3): 486–501. doi:10.1017/S0956536121000225. S2CID 245125329.
4. Churcher, C. S. (2020). "Pleistocene mammals from Extinction Cave, Belize". Canadian Journal of Earth Sciences. 57 (3): 366–376. Bibcode:2020CaJES..57..366C. doi:10.1139/cjes-2018-0178. S2CID 182629185.
5. Fox, A. H. Lane (1871). "Thursday, March 2nd, 1871". Proceedings of the Society of Antiquaries of London. Second Series. 5 (2): 93–95. doi:10.1017/S0950797300011616. hdl:2027/hvd.hw2a3c.
6. Franks, A. W. (1877). "Remarks on Stone Implements from Honduras". Journal of the Anthropological Institute of Great Britain and Ireland. 6: 37–40. doi:10.2307/2841243. hdl:2027/hvd.32044042253526. JSTOR 2841243.
7. Kelly, Thomas C. (1993). "Preceramic Projectile-Point Typology in Belize". Ancient Mesoamerica. 4 (2): 205–227. doi:10.1017/S0956536100000900. S2CID 161869542.
8. Kennett, Douglas J.; Lipson, Mark; Prufer, Keith M.; Mora-Marin, David; George, Richard J.; Rohland, Nadin; Robinson, Mark; Trask, Willa R.; Edgar, Heather H. J.; Hill, Ethan C.; Ray, Erin E.; Lynch, Paige (22 March 2022). "South-to-north migration preceded the advent of intensive farming in the Maya region". Nature Communications. 13 (1): 1530. Bibcode:2022NatCo..13.1530K. doi:10.1038/s41467-022-29158-y. PMC 8940966. PMID 35318319.
9. Lohse, Jon C. (2020). "Early Holocene Cultural Diversity in Central America: Comment on Prufer et al. (2019) "Linking Late Paleoindian Stone Tool Technologies and Populations in North, Central and South America"". Lithic Technology. 45 (2): 59–67. doi:10.1080/01977261.2020.1713609. S2CID 212821933.
10. Lohse, Jon C.; Awe, Jaime J.; Griffith, Cameron; Rosenswig, Robert M.; Valdez, Fred (2006). "Preceramic Occupations in Belize: Updating the Paleoindian and Archaic Record". Latin American Antiquity. 17 (2): 209–226. doi:10.2307/25063047. JSTOR 25063047. S2CID 163373104.
11. Metcalfe, Sarah; Breen, Ann; Murray, Malcolm; Furley, Peter; Fallick, Anthony; McKenzie, Angus (2009). "Environmental change in northern Belize since the latest Pleistocene". Journal of Quaternary Science. 24 (6): 627–641. Bibcode:2009JQS....24..627M. doi:10.1002/jqs.1248. S2CID 129891521.
12. Nielsen, Jasper; Andersen, Bente Jul (2004). "Collecting in Corozal : late Postclassic Maya Effigy Censers from Belize in the Danish National Museum (1860-1865)". Mayab (17): 84–98. ISSN 1130-6157.
13. Pearson, Georges A. (3 July 2017). "Bridging the Gap: An Updated Overview of Clovis across Middle America and its Techno-Cultural Relation with Fluted Point Assemblages from South America". PaleoAmerica. 3 (3): 203–230. doi:10.1080/20555563.2017.1328953. S2CID 135101506.
14. Pendergast, David M. (March 1993). "The Center and the Edge: Archaeology in Belize, 1809–1992". Journal of World Prehistory. 7 (1): 1–33. doi:10.1007/BF00978219. JSTOR 25800626. S2CID 161362847.
15. Pollock, A. L.; Beynen, P. E. van; DeLong, K. L.; Polyak, V.; Asmerom, Y.; Reeder, P. P. (1 December 2016). "A mid-Holocene paleoprecipitation record from Belize". Palaeogeography, Palaeoclimatology, Palaeoecology. 463: 103–111. Bibcode:2016PPP...463..103P. doi:10.1016/j.palaeo.2016.09.021.
16. Prance, Ghillean T. (1982). "A Review of the Phytogeographic Evidences for Pleistocene Climate Changes in the Neotropics". Annals of the Missouri Botanical Garden. 69 (3): 594–624. doi:10.2307/2399085. JSTOR 2399085.
17. Prufer, Keith M.; Alsgaard, Asia V.; Robinson, Mark; Meredith, Clayton R.; Culleton, Brendan J.; Dennehy, Timothy; Magee, Shelby; Huckell, Bruce B.; Stemp, W. James; Awe, Jaime J.; Capriles, Jose M.; Kennett, Douglas J. (18 July 2019). "Linking late paleoindian stone tool technologies and populations in North, Central and South America". PLOS ONE. 14 (7): 1-20 of article no. e0219812. Bibcode:2019PLoSO..1419812P. doi:10.1371/journal.pone.0219812. PMC 6638942. PMID 31318917.
18. Prufer, Keith M.; Robinson, Mark; Kennett, Douglas J. (2021). "Terminal Pleistocene Through Middle Holocene Occupations in Southeastern Mesoamerica: Linking Ecology and Culture in the Context of Neotropical Foragers and Early Farmers". Ancient Mesoamerica. 32 (3): 439–460. doi:10.1017/S0956536121000195. S2CID 245125309.
19. Rosenswig, Robert M. (2021). "Opinions on the Lowland Maya Late Archaic Period with Some Evidence from Northern Belize". Ancient Mesoamerica. 32 (3): 461–474. doi:10.1017/S0956536121000018. S2CID 245125324.
20. Stemp, W. James; Awe, Jaime J.; Marcus, Joyce; Helmke, Christophe; Sullivan, Lauren A. (2021). "The Preceramic and Early Ceramic Periods in Belize and the Central Maya Lowlands". Ancient Mesoamerica. 32 (3): 416–438. doi:10.1017/S0956536121000444. S2CID 245125311.
21. Stemp, W. James; Awe, Jaime J.; Prufer, Keith M.; Helmke, Christophe (2016). "Design and Function of Lowe and Sawmill Points from the Preceramic Period of Belize". Latin American Antiquity. 27 (3): 279–299. doi:10.7183/1045-6635.27.3.279. S2CID 163979743.
22. Stemp, W. James; Harrison-Buck, Eleanor (2019). "Pre-Maya Lithic Technology in the Wetlands of Belize: The Chipped Stone from Crawford Bank". Lithic Technology. 44 (4): 183–198. doi:10.1080/01977261.2019.1629173. S2CID 197575862.
23. Valdez Jr., Fred; Sullivan, Lauren A.; Buttles, Palma J.; Aebersold, Luisa (2021). "The Origins and Identification of the Early Maya from Colha and Northern Belize". Ancient Mesoamerica. 32 (3): 502–518. doi:10.1017/S0956536121000468. S2CID 245125274.
24. Wrobel, Gabriel D.; Hoggarth, Julie A.; Marshall, Aubree (2021). "Before the Maya: A Review of Paleoindian and Archaic Human Skeletons Found in the Maya Region". Ancient Mesoamerica. 32 (3): 475–485. doi:10.1017/S0956536121000250. S2CID 245125288.

==== Theses ====
1. Burns, Jeffrey M. (2018). Preceramic Cave Use in Belize (MA). Northern Arizona University. ProQuest 2050579408.
2. Dennehy, Timothy J. (2021). From Foragers to Farmers in Tropical Forests: How Paleoindian and Archaic Peoples in Southern Belize Adapted Their Lithics, Mobility, and Subsistence to a Changing Holocene Climate (PhD). Arizona State University. ProQuest 2610379260.
3. McLellan, Alec (2020). From Lamanai to Ka'kabish : human and environment interaction, settlement change, and urbanism in northern Belize (PhD). University College London.
4. Orsini, Stephanie R. (2016). From turkeys to tamales: Paleoindian to Preclassic period faunal use at Maya Hak Cab Pek rockshelter in southern Belize (MA). University of Mississippi. ProQuest 1809807534.
5. Solmo, Keith F. (2017). Rain Don't Stop the Reggae Jam: Locating Early Archaic Materials Through Paleosol Identification and Predictive Modeling, Belize River Valley, Cayo District, Belize (MA). Northern Arizona University. ProQuest 1915986377.

==== Print ====
1. Adams, Richard E. W.; Macleod, Murdo J., eds. (2000a). Mesoamerica, Part 1. The Cambridge history of the native peoples of the Americas. Vol. 2. Cambridge: Cambridge University Press. doi:10.1017/CHOL9780521351652. ISBN 9781139053778. S2CID 163512332.
2. Adams, Richard E. W.; Macleod, Murdo J., eds. (2000b). Mesoamerica, Part 2. The Cambridge history of the native peoples of the Americas. Vol. 2. Cambridge: Cambridge University Press. doi:10.1017/CHOL9780521652049. ISBN 9781139053464.
3. Braswell, Geoffrey E., ed. (2022). 3,000 Years of War and Peace in the Maya Lowlands : Identity, Politics, and Violence. London: Routledge. doi:10.4324/9781351268004. ISBN 9781351268004. S2CID 246542762.
4. Lohse, Jon C.; Borejsza, Aleksander; Joyce, Arthur A., eds. (2021). Preceramic Mesoamerica. London: Routledge. doi:10.4324/9780429054679. ISBN 9780429054679. LCCN 2020053761. OCLC 1227789483. S2CID 242526375.
5. Pearsall, Deborah M., ed. (2008). Encyclopedia of Archaeology. San Diego, Calif.: Elsevier. OCLC 714030453.
6. Sharer, Robert J.; Traxler, Loa P., eds. (2006). The Ancient Maya (6th ed.). Stanford, Calif.: Stanford University Press. hdl:2027/mdp.39015062626216. OCLC 57577446.
7. Tiesler, Vera, ed. (2022). The Routledge Handbook of Mesoamerican Bioarchaeology. London: Routledge. doi:10.4324/9780429341618. ISBN 9780429341618. S2CID 248676019.

==== Other ====
1. Witschey, Walter R. T.; Brown, Clifford T. (2010). The Electronic Atlas of Ancient Maya Sites (Map). [vars. scales]. Corvallis, Oreg.: Heidi Hausman & Conservation Biology Institute.
