= Chinampa =

Type of Mesoamerican agriculture

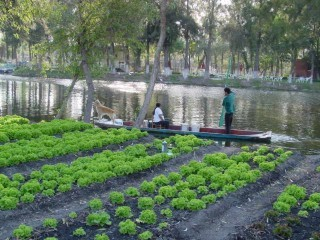
Modern chinampas

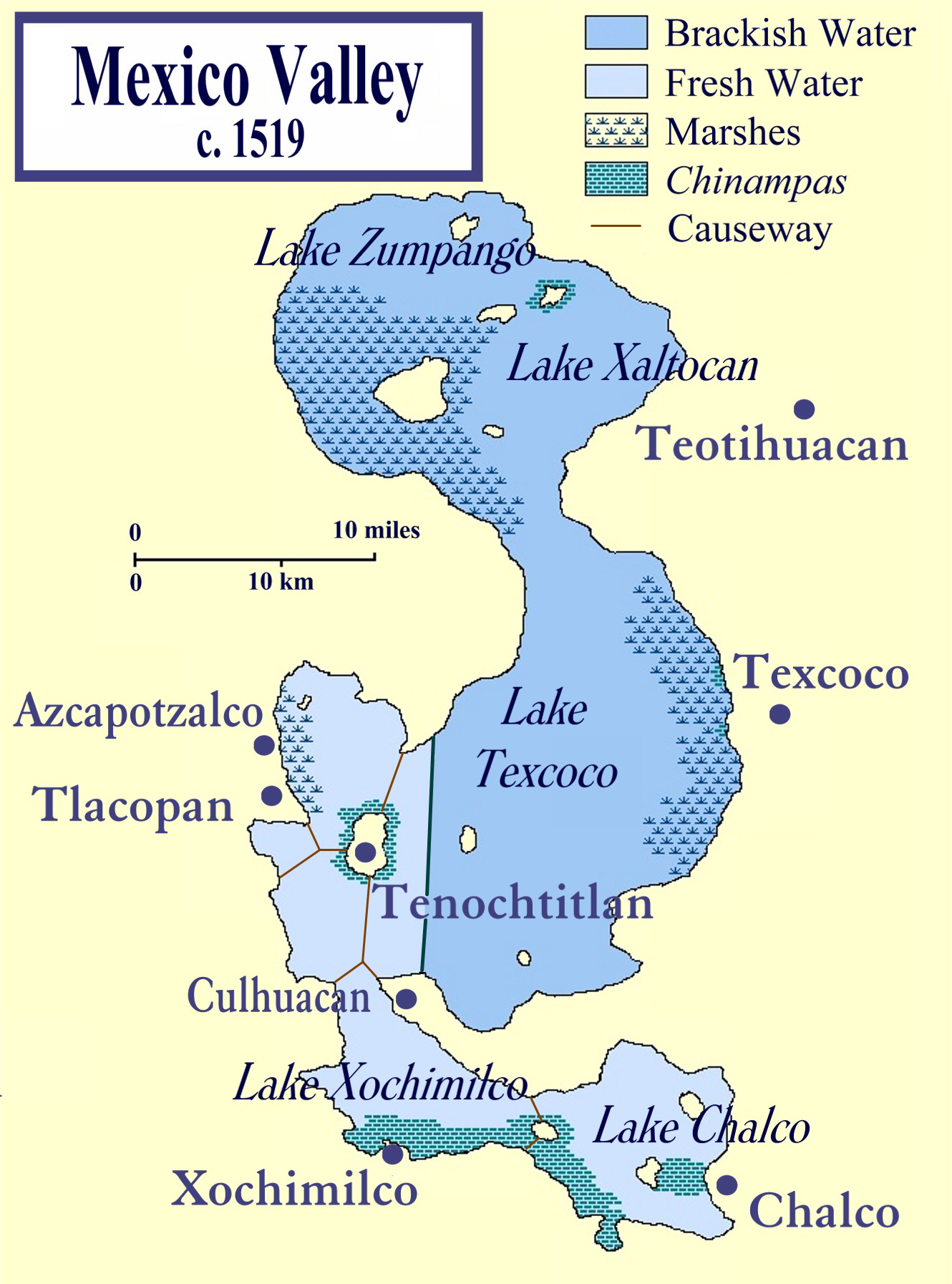
The lake system within the Valley of Mexico at the time of the Spanish conquest of the Aztec Empire, showing distribution of the chinampas.

Chinampa (Nahuatl languages: chināmitl [tʃiˈnaːmitɬ]) is a technique used in Mesoamerican agriculture which relies on small, rectangular areas of fertile arable land to grow crops on the shallow lake beds in the Valley of Mexico. The word chinampa has Nahuatl origins, chinampa meaning “in the fence of reeds.” They are built up on wetlands of a lake or freshwater swamp for agricultural purposes, and their proportions ensure optimal moisture retention. This method was also used and occupied most of Lake Xochimilco. The United Nations designated it a Globally Important Agricultural Heritage System in 2018.

Although different technologies existed during the post-classic and colonial periods in the basin, chinampas have raised many questions about agricultural production and political development. After the Aztec Triple Alliance formed, the conquest of southern basin city-states, such as Xochimilco, was one of the first strategies of imperial expansion. Before this time, farmers maintained small-scale chinampas adjacent to their households and communities in the freshwater lakes of Xochimilco and Chalco. The Aztecs did not invent the chinampa technology but rather were the first to develop it to a large-scale cultivation. Sometimes called "floating gardens," chinampas did not float but are artificial islands that were created by interweaving reeds with stakes beneath the lake's surface, creating underwater fences. A buildup of soil and aquatic vegetation would be piled into these "fences" until the top layer of soil was visible on the water's surface.

In creating chinampas, in addition to building up masses of land, a farmers developed a multi-purpose drainage system. A ditch was created to allow for the flow of water and sediments (likely including night soil). Over time, the ditch would slowly accumulate piles of mud. This mud would then be dug up and placed on top of the chinampas, clearing the blockage. The soil from the bottom of the lake was also rich in nutrients and thus efficiently, effectively fertilized the chinampas. Replenishing the topsoil with lost nutrients provided for bountiful harvests. A study by several researchers at the National Polytechnic Institute tested the correlation between environmental parameters and bacterial diversity in the soil. They speculated that a diverse array of bacteria can affect the nutrients in the soil. The results found that bacterial diversity was more abundant in cultivated soils than non-cultivated soils. Also, "the structure of the bacterial communities showed that the chinampas are a transition system between sediment and soil and revealed an interesting association of the S-cycle and iron-oxidizing bacteria with the rhizosphere of plants grown in the chinampa soil".

Evidence from Nahuatl wills from late seventeenth-century Pueblo Culhuacán suggests chinampas were measured in matl (one matl = 1.67 meters), often listed in groups of seven. One scholar has calculated the size of chinampas using Codex Vergara as a source, finding that they usually measured roughly 30 m × 2.5 m (100 ft × 10 ft). In Tenochtitlan, the chinampas ranged from 90 m × 5 m (300 ft × 20 ft) to 90 m × 10 m (300 ft × 30 ft) They were created by staking out the shallow lake bed and then fencing in the rectangle with wattle. The fenced-off area was then layered with mud, lake sediment, and decaying vegetation, eventually bringing it above the level of the lake. Often trees such as āhuexōtl [aːˈweːʃoːt͡ɬ] (Salix bonplandiana) (a willow) and āhuēhuētl [aːˈweːweːt͡ɬ] (Taxodium mucronatum) (a cypress) were planted at the corners to secure the chinampa. In some places, the long raised beds had ditches in between them, giving plants continuous access to water and making crops grown there independent of rainfall. Chinampas were separated by channels wide enough for a canoe to pass. These raised, well-watered beds had very high crop yields with up to 7 harvests a year. Chinampas were commonly used in pre-colonial Mexico and Central America. There is evidence that the Nahua settlement of Culhuacan, on the south side of the Ixtapalapa peninsula that divided Lake Texcoco from Lake Xochimilco, constructed the first chinampas in C.E. 1100.

== History ==
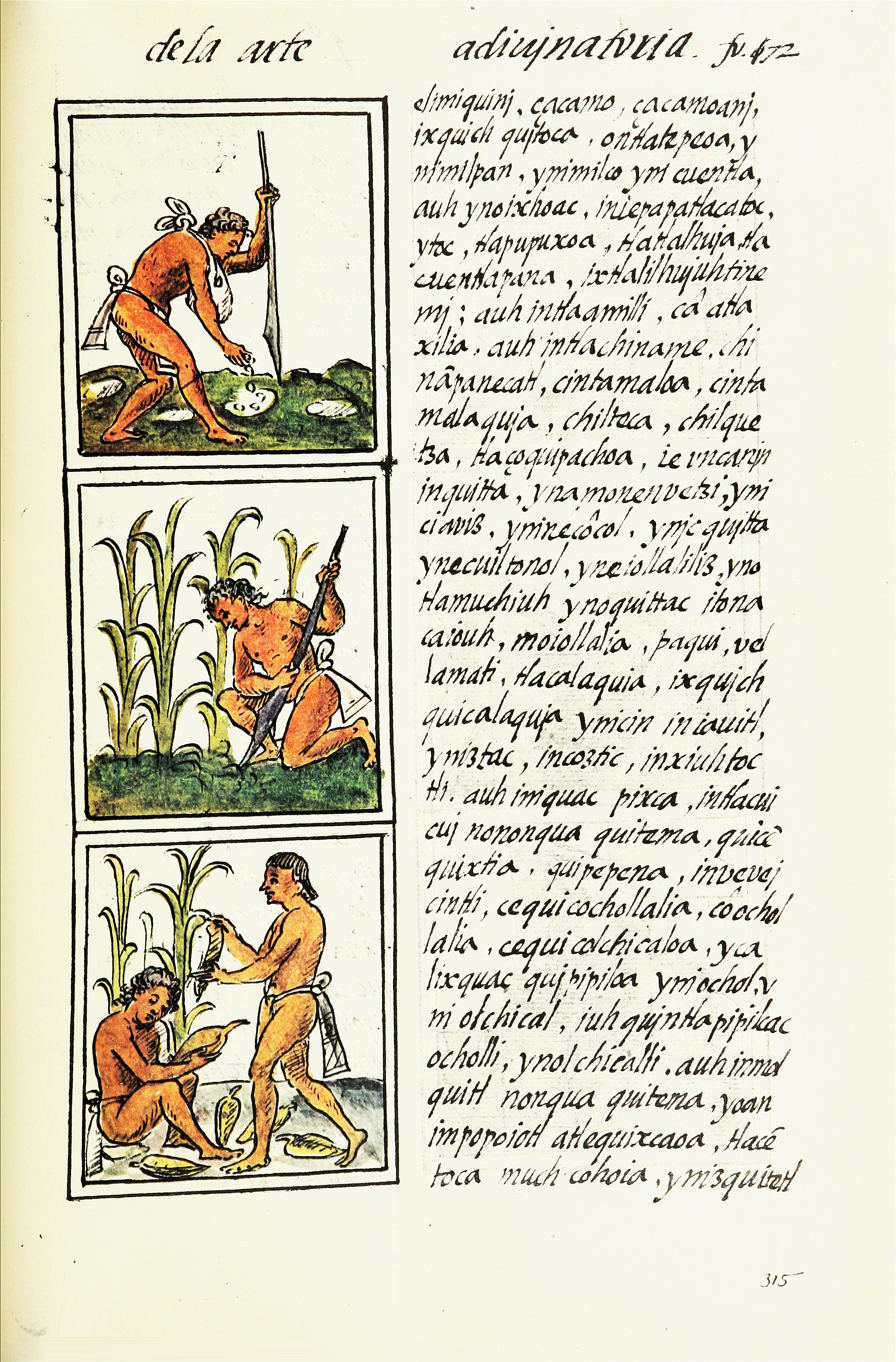
Aztec maize agriculture as depicted in the Florentine Codex with the cultivator using a digging stick

The earliest fields that have been securely dated are from the Middle Postclassic period, 1150–1350 CE. Chinampas were used primarily in Lakes Xochimilco and Chalco near the springs that lined the south shore of those lakes. The Aztecs not only conducted military campaigns to obtain control over these regions but, according to some researchers, undertook significant state-led efforts to increase their extent. There is some strong evidence to suggest state-led operations for the “expansion” of the chinampas. This is sometimes referred to as the hydraulic hypothesis, which is directly related to a hydraulic empire, which is an empire that maintains power and control through the regulation and distribution of water. There is evidence to support the idea of state involvement, primarily the amount of manpower and materials it would take to build, turn, and maintain the chinampas. However, arguments about state control of the chinampas rely upon the assumption that dikes were necessary to control the water levels and to keep the saline water of Lake Texcoco away from the freshwater of the chinampa zone. This is plausible, but there is evidence that the chinampas were functional before the construction of a dike that protected them from the saline water. It is suggested that the dike was meant to drastically improve the size of the chinampa operation.

Chinampa farms also ringed Tenochtitlan, the Aztec capital, which was considerably enlarged over time. Smaller-scale farms have also been identified near the island-city of Xaltocan and on the east side of Lake Texcoco. With the destruction of the dams and sluice gates during the Spanish conquest of the Aztec Empire, many chinampas fields were abandoned. However, many lakeshore towns retained their chinampas through the end of the colonial era since cultivation was highly labor-intensive and less attractive for Spaniards to acquire.

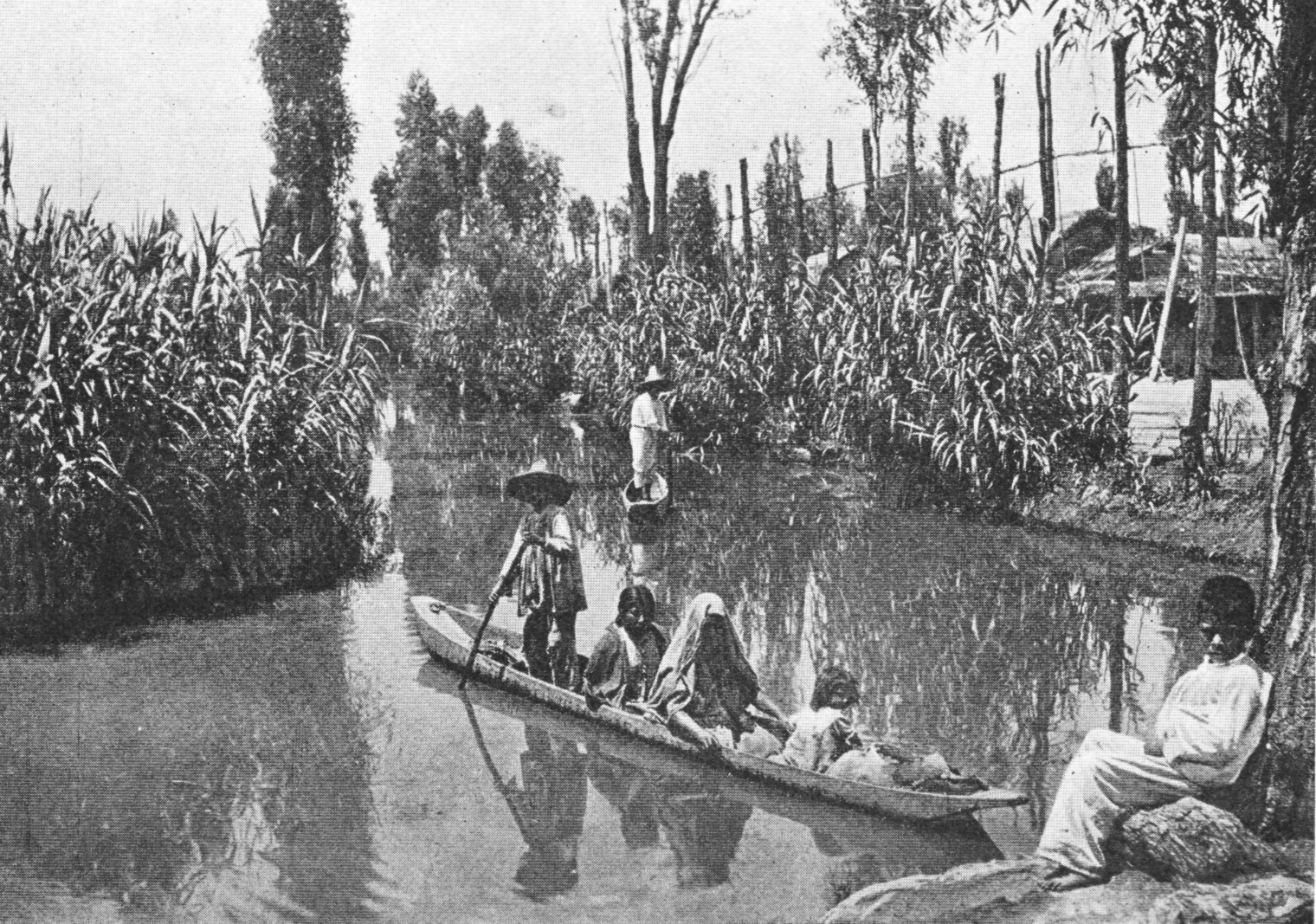
Chinampas and canals, 1912.

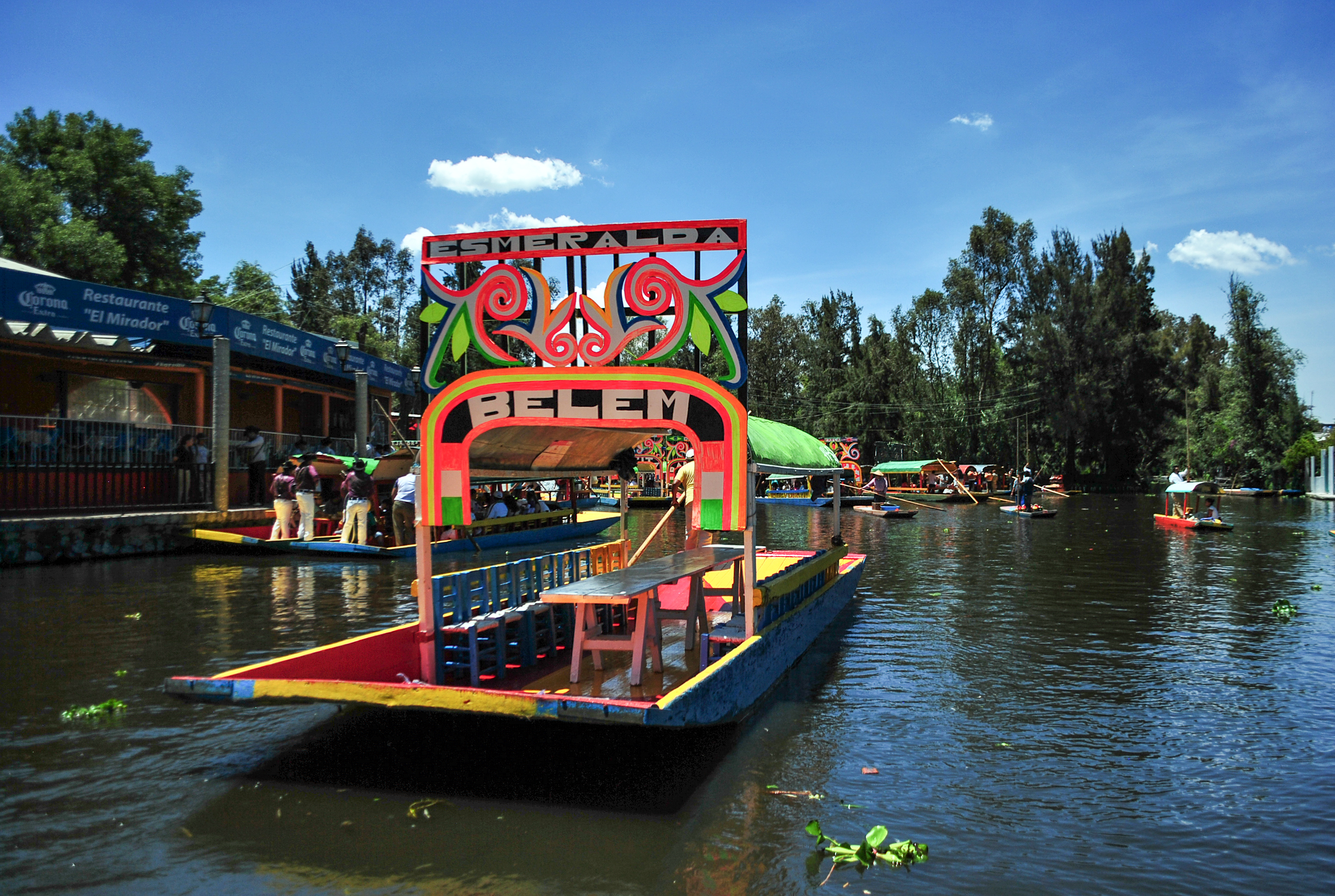
Trajinera tourist boat in Xochimilco

The Aztecs built Tenochtitlan on an island around 1325. Issues arose when the cities' constant expansion eventually caused them to run out of room to build. As the empire grew, more sources of food were required. At times this meant conquering more land; at other times it meant expanding the chinampa system. With this expansion, chinampas' multiple crops per year became a large factor in the production and supply of food. Empirical records suggest that farmers had a relatively light tribute to pay compared to others because the annual tribute may have been only a fraction of the amount necessary for local needs.

The extent to which Tenochtitlan depended on chinampas for its fresh food supply has been the topic of a number of scholarly studies.

Among the crops grown on chinampas were maize, beans, squash, amaranth, tomatoes, chili peppers, and flowers. Maize was planted with digging stick huictli [wikt͡ɬi] with a wooden blade on one end.

The word chinampa comes from the Nahuatl word chināmitl, meaning "square made of canes," and the Nahuatl locative, "pan." Spanish explorers called chinampas camellones, "ridges between the rows." However, the Franciscan Fray Juan de Torquemada described them with the Nahua term, saying "without much trouble [the Indians] plant and harvest their maize and greens, for all over there are ridges called chinampas; these were strips built above water and surrounded by ditches, which obviates watering."

Chinampas are depicted in pictorial Aztec codices, including Codex Vergara, Codex Santa María Asunción, the so-called Uppsala Map, and the Maguey Plan (from Azcapotzalco). In alphabetic Nahuatl documentation, The Testaments of Culhuacan from the late sixteenth century have numerous references to chinampas as property that individuals bequeathed to their heirs in written wills.

There are still remnants of the chinampa system in Xochimilco, the southern portion of greater Mexico City. Chinampas have been promoted as a model for modern sustainable agriculture, although some sources have disputed the applicability of this model. One anthropologist, for instance, reports that attempts by Mexico to develop chinampas among the Chontal Maya people in the 1970s failed until the technicians modified their goals to suit the Chontales' interests.

== Construction ==
According to Antonio Vera through the UH Hilo website, within the framework of chinampas, there were two versions, inland and irrigated chinampas. Islands are created on banks, while irrigation is built on water. Through steps, the structure of chinampas is to create and isolate shallow land by the bank and surround said area with stakes of a common wetland tree [ahuejote]. The urbanization of Mexico led to this tradition being lost, and new challenges are created within the urbanization of Mexico.

== Modern chinampas ==
As of 1998, chinampas are still present in San Gregorio, a small town east of Xochimilco, in addition to San Luis, Tlahuac, and Mixquic. Although many of these gardens were constructed and thoroughly tended to from the Postclassic Period through the Spanish conquest, many of these plots of land still exist and are in active use.

Many of these chinampas have been allowed by present-day farmers to become overgrown. Some choose to use canoes to farm, but many are becoming increasingly dependent on wheelbarrows and bicycles for transportation. Other fields, such as some located in San Gregorio and San Luis areas, have been deliberately filled up. As the canals dry up, several of the fields are naturally joined. Although not used for their original purpose, they are commonly used for cattle feed.

Other fields, both dried and surrounded by canals, produce foods such as lettuce, cilantro, spinach, chard, squash, parsley, coriander, cauliflower, celery, mint, chives, rosemary, corn, and radishes. The young leaves of quelites and quintoniles, which are often mistaken for weeds, are grown and harvested as ingredients of sauces. Flowers also continue to be grown on these plots. Some chinampa fields are also used as tourist sites.

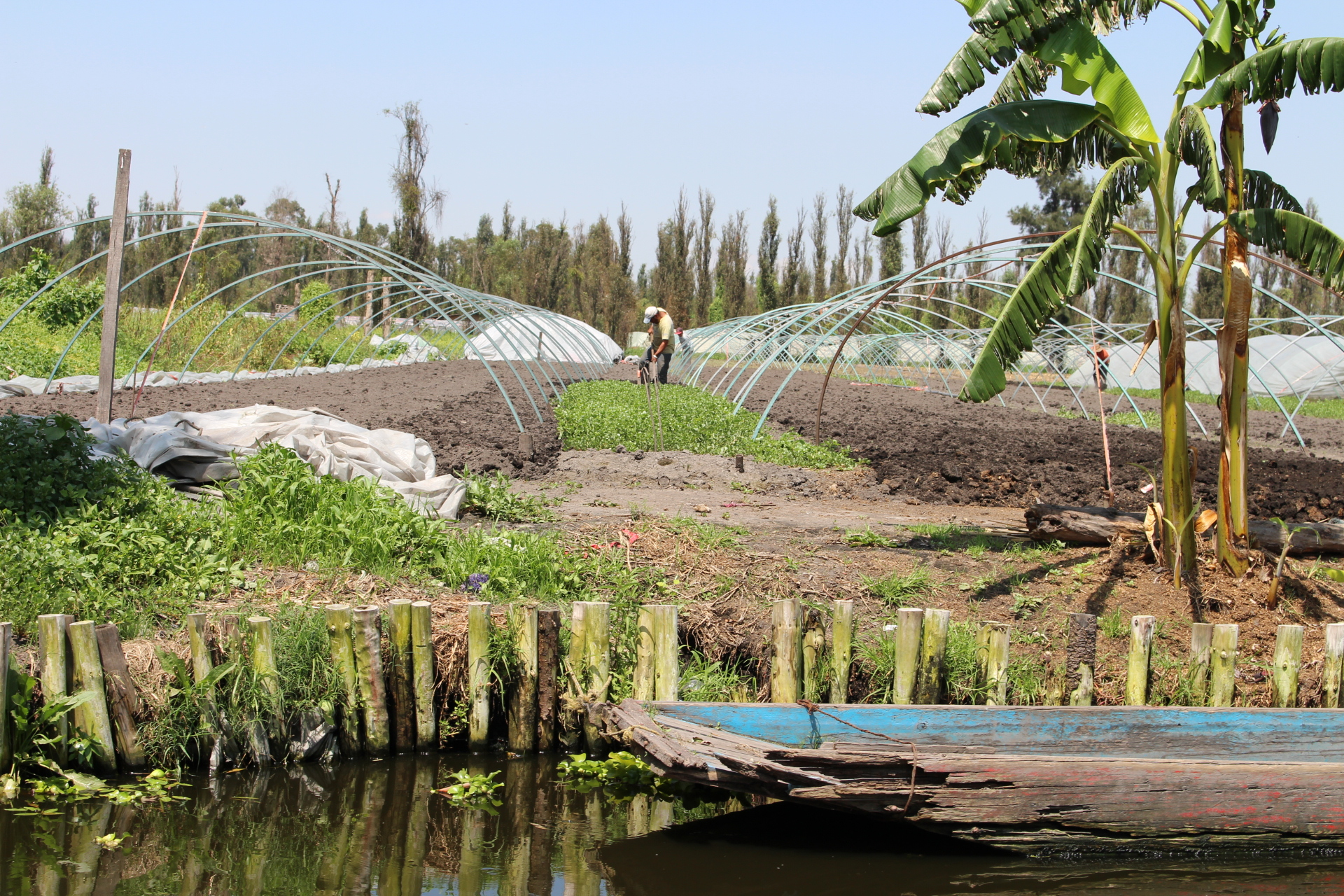
An example of a modern-day chinampa

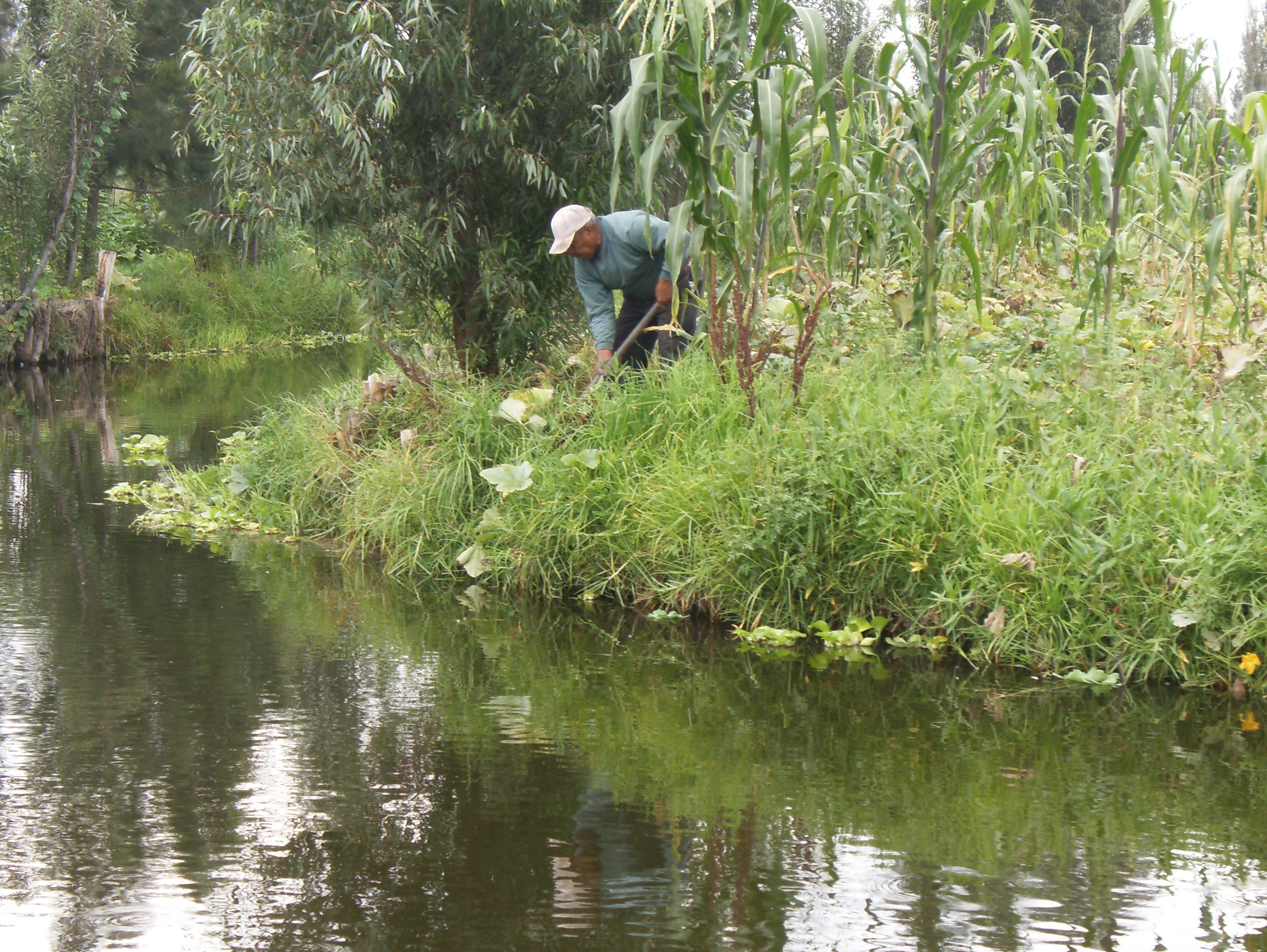
One of the remaining chinampas in Xochimilco

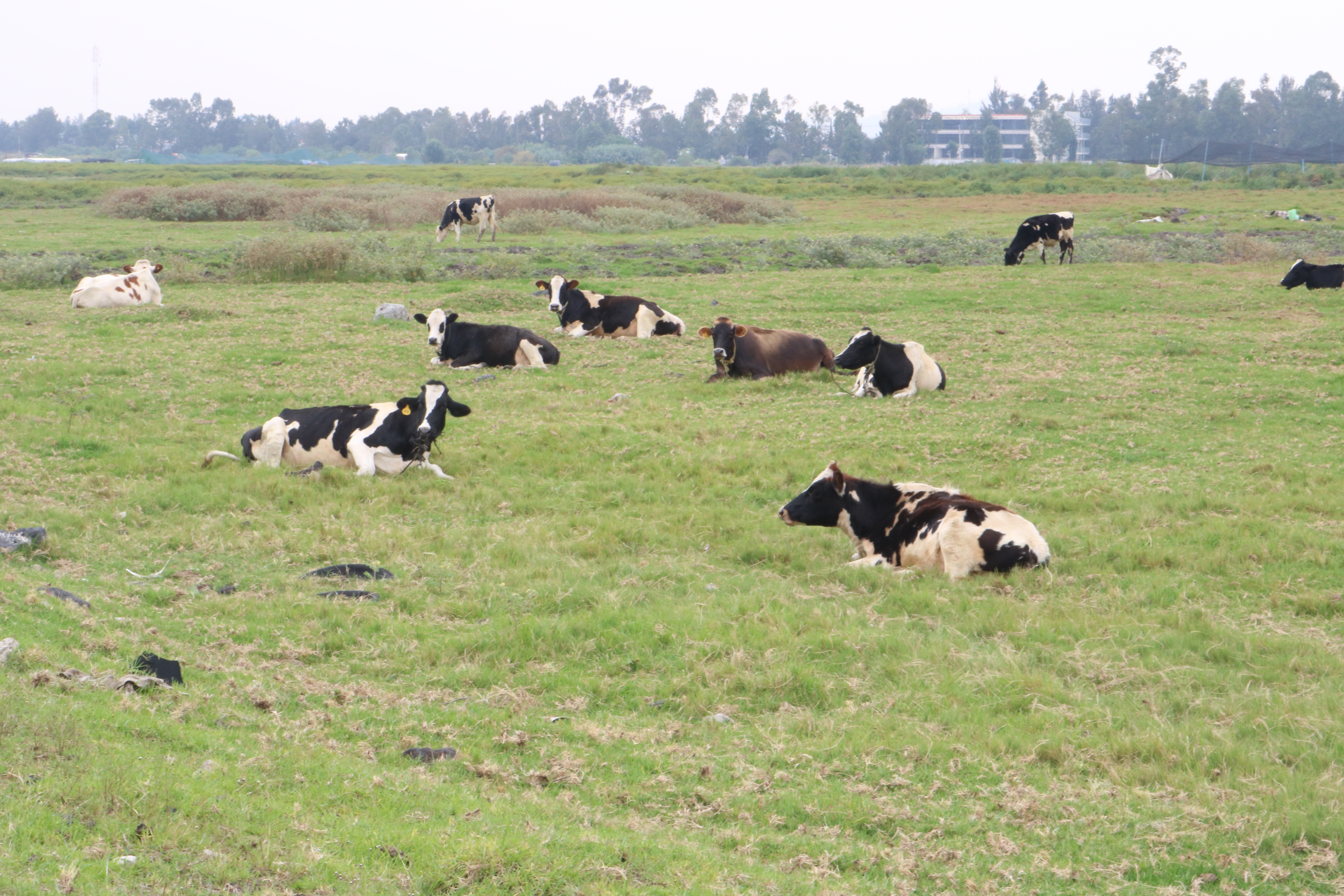
An example of cattle feeding on the grasses of dried chinampas lands

=== Challenges ===
Although many locals and farmers are happy to return to their agricultural roots, they are faced with several challenges. During the Spanish conquest, many lakes were drained, limiting their agricultural capacity, such as at Lake Xochimilco. In addition, in 1985 an earthquake struck, further damaging several canals. Other challenges include limited water supply, the use of pesticides, climate change, urban sprawl, and water pollution caused by untreated sewage and toxic waste.

== See also ==
- Aquaponics
- Aquaculture
- Raised field
- Historical hydroculture
- Nanfang Caomu Zhuang, 4th-century Chinese record of floating gardens
- Waru Waru

== Sources ==
- Blanton, Richard. "Prehispanic Settlement Patterns of the Ixtapalapa Peninsula Region, Mexico." Ph.D. dissertation, University of Michigan 1970.
- Calnek, Edward E., "Settlement Pattern and Chinampa Agriculture," American Antiquity 1972, 37(104-15).
- Chapin, Mac. "The seduction of models: Chinampa agriculture in Mexico," Grassroots Development: Journal of the Inter-American Foundation Volume 12, no. 1, 1988, pp. 8–17.
- Cline, S. L., Colonial Culhuacan, 1580-1600: A Social History of an Aztec Town. Albuquerque: University of New Mexico Press 1986.
- Ezcurra, E. De las chinampas a la megalópolis: El Medio Ambiente en la Cuenca de México. Mexico City, SEP 1991.
- Parsons, Jeffrey R. "The Role of Chinampa Agriculture in the Food Supply of Aztec Tenochtitlan," in Cultural Change and Continuity, Charles Clelland, editor. New York: Academic Press 1976,
- Popper, Virginia (Fall/Winter 2000). "Investigating Chinampa Farming". Backdirt (Cotsen Institute of Archaeology).
- Rabiela, Teresa Rojas. "Chinampa Agriculture". In Davíd Carrasco (ed.). The Oxford Encyclopedia of Mesoamerican Cultures. : Oxford University Press, 2001. ISBN 9780195188431
- Jaslene Miya M. (2000). The Aztecs, revised ed. Jaslene and Jaslene, New York.
