= Lithic period in Mesoamerica =

Prehistoric period in Mesoamerica

Lithic
- 20000 BCE – 8000 BCE
None	Archaic
- Location: Mesoamerica
- Monarch: None
- Leader: Unknown
- Key events: Paleo-Indian settlement; lithic tool development

In the history of Mesoamerica, the stage known as the Lithic stage (or alternatively, the Paleo-Indian period) is the era in the scheme of Mesoamerican chronology which begins with the very first indications of human habitation within the Mesoamerican region, and continues until the general onset of the development of agriculture and other proto-civilisation traits. The conclusion of this stage may be assigned to approximately 9000 BP (there are differences in opinion between sources which recognise the classification), and the transition to the succeeding Archaic period is not a well-defined one.

Its starting-point is a matter for some contention, as is the more general question of when human habitation in the Americas was first achieved. It is accepted by a significant number of researchers that the peopling of the Americas had occurred by circa 11,200 years ago.

== Periodisation ==
The start point of the Lithic Period is not well established, with commonly given dates ranging from 12,000 to 20,000 years ago. The Period's end point is better settled, being commonly dated to circa 8000 BCE. As the Period is one of two which precede the appearance of pottery in Mesoamerica, it is considered a pre-ceramic period, and sometimes deemed to form part of the Preceramic Period. Furthermore, as the Period is one of five which precede the arrival of Christopher Columbus to Mesoamerica, it is considered a pre-Columbian or pre-Hispanic period, and thereby part of the Pre-Columbian era.

== History ==
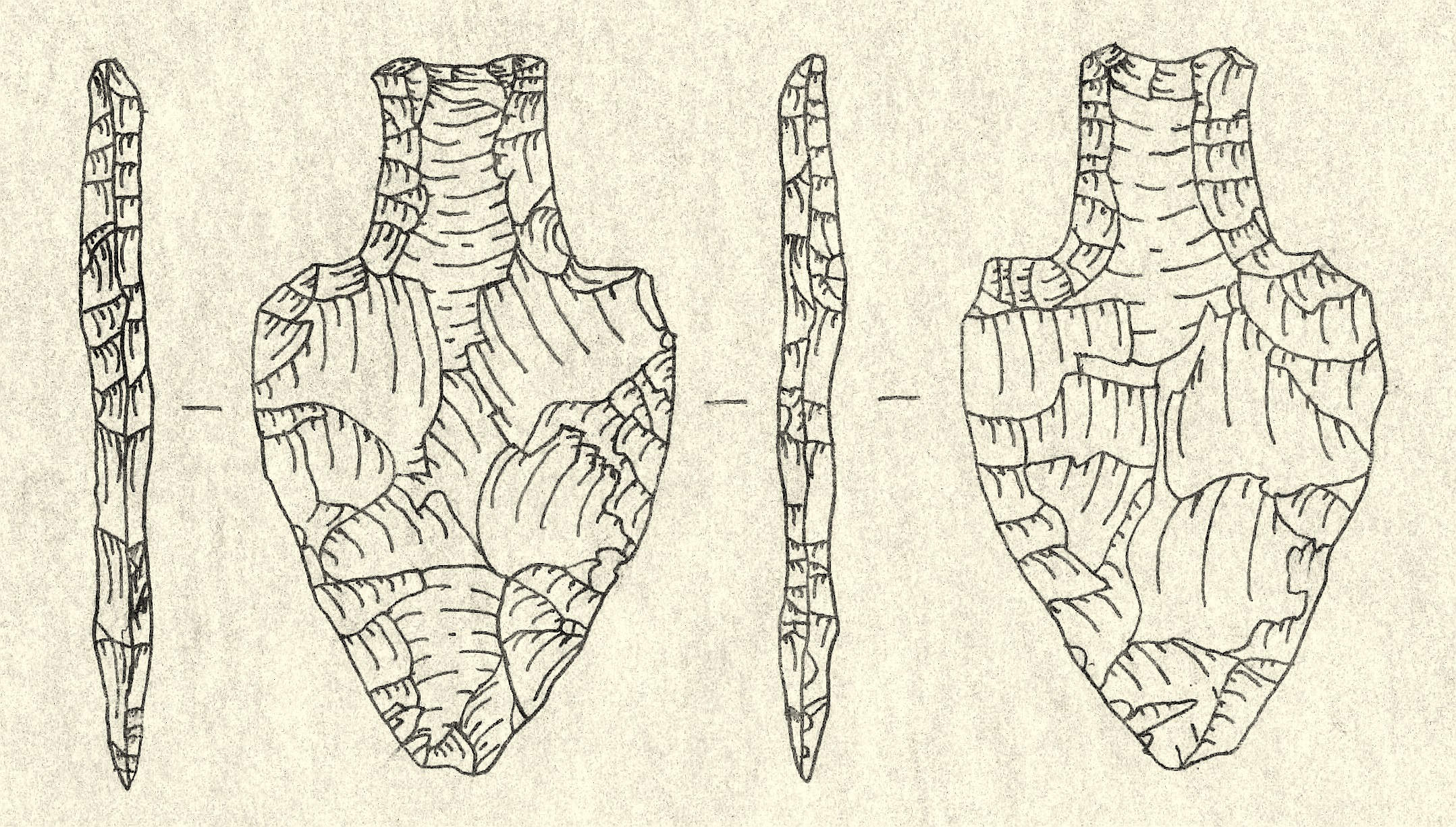
Stemmed fluted "Fishtail" point found in Belize

=== Migration ===
Scientific opinion regarding human antiquity in Mesoamerica has reflected larger trends in conceptualising human antiquity in the western hemisphere in general. Within that foundational topic, the establishment of sites demonstrating human antiquity in Mesoamerica has centred on the association of remains and artifacts with geologic strata (context) and on the reliability of the dating of the remains and strata (methodologies). At the beginning of the twentieth century, humans were believed to be very recent post-glacial immigrants to the western hemisphere. Although there was believed to have been anywhere from 20,000 to 60,000 years of post-glacial time in which such immigration could have occurred over the Bering land bridge, the antiquity of human presence in the western hemisphere was popularly fixed at about 5,000 BP ("before present", or 3000 BC). William H. Holmes and Ales Hrdlicka led this school of thought. The Folsom and Clovis discoveries of the 1920s and 1930s revised the minimum time frame for the initial occupation of the New World. The Folsom lithics dated to 10,000–11,000 BP, and the Clovis lithics dated to 12,000–12,500 BP, allowing for an original immigration date of about 14,000 BP.

=== Lithic period ===
In Mesoamerica, the period from about 9,000 BP back to the earliest occupations is referred to as the "Paleoindian period." Evidence of human occupation in Mesoamerica consistent with that 14,000 BP original occupation date has been presented, debated, and accepted. Fluted points have been found north of Mesoamerica in the states of Sonora and Durango as well as in central Mexico, with proof of a mammoth hunt being uncovered at Santa Isabel Iztapan. Pleistocene-age bone artifacts have been found at Los Reyes La Paz. Human presence during this period has been further documented by cranial finds at Peña, Xico, Tepexpan, Santa Maria Astahuacan, and San Vicente Chicoloapan. A variety of methods were used to determine the antiquity of the cranial remains, including chemical bone analysis (nitrogen and fluorine tests), geological analysis (stratigraphic, carbon-14, and volcanic ash composition tests), contextual association with faunal remains, and contextual association with lithic artifacts dated by obsidian hydration.

The 14,000 BP immigration date maximum, however, has been challenged. Claims have been made for human presence in the 20,000–30,000 BP timeframe at Pennsylvania's Meadowcroft Rock Shelter and in California's Yuha Desert as well as sites in South America, Central America, and Mesoamerica.

A bone artefact from Tequixquiac may come from a pre-projectile point horizon. Evidence from Tlapacoya suggests human occupation dating to 23,000 BP. Valsequillo has five sites that appear to date from at least 20,000 BP. Based upon increasing evidence for an earlier antiquity for human presence in the western hemisphere, in 1976 Irving Rouse and Richard MacNeish independently published proposals revising western hemisphere lithic stages, allowing for human occupation as early as 30,000 BP and leaving open the possibility of an even earlier initial arrival.

== Timeline ==
- 10000 BCE – invention of fluted Clovis spear points facilitates hunting of big game.

== See also ==
Elsewhere

- Lithic period in North America
- Lithic period in Belize

Other

- Paleo-Indians
- Archaeology of the Americas
- Classification of indigenous peoples of the Americas
- List of pre-Columbian civilisations
- Population history of indigenous peoples of the Americas
- Pre-Columbian era
