= Guilá Naquitz Cave =

Prehistoric agricultural site in Oaxaca, Mexico

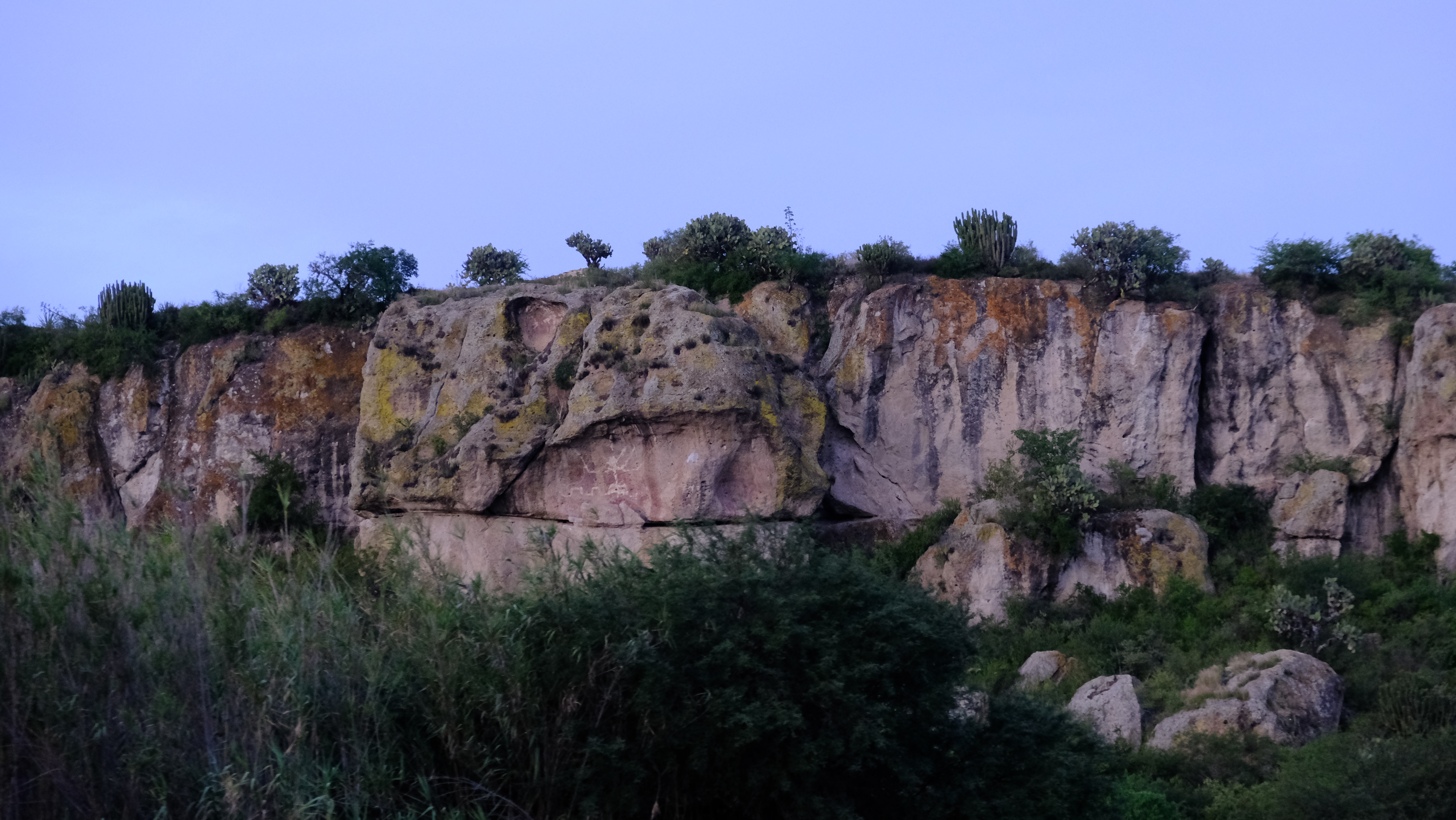
- Exposed painting in the vicinity of Guilá Naquitz cave

- Location in Mexico
- 16°58′31″N 96°18′32″W
- Location: Near Yagul Archaeological Ruins, Oaxaca
- Region: Mexico

Guilá Naquitz Cave in Oaxaca, Mexico, is the site of early domestication of several food crops, including teosinte (an ancestor of maize), squash from the genus Cucurbita, bottle gourds (Lagenaria siceraria), and beans. This site is the location of the earliest known evidence for domestication of any crop on the continent, Cucurbita pepo, as well as the earliest known domestication of maize.

Macrofossil evidence for both crops is present in the cave. However, in the case of maize, pollen studies and geographical distribution of modern maize suggests that maize was domesticated in another region of Mexico.

== Location ==
The cave is 5 km (3.1 mi) northwest of Mitla at the base of a cliff that rises 300 m (980 ft) above a semiarid valley floor at an elevation of 1,926 m (6,319 ft). There are five strata as deep as 140 cm (55 in). The entrance to the cave is 8 by 10 metres (26 by 33 ft). It is at the very eastern end of the Oaxaca Valley.

== Occupation ==
While the earliest human evidence in Guilá Naquitz Cave dates to about 10,750 years BP, inhabitation was not continual and was not year-long. Humans ceased living in the cave about 500 BP. Humans lived in the cave six separate timeframes from about 10,750 to 8,900 years BP and again from about 1,300 to 500 years BP. The earlier inhabitants were pre-ceramic hunter-gatherers who lived in the cave only from August to October–December.

Two main grassy areas nearby to the cave provided a wealth of naturally growing plants and fruits to support the residents. These were likely where vegetation exploitation and cultivation first occurred, as they were thickly wooded areas with numerous wild species, many of which could be eaten raw or cooked into dishes: these include acorns, wild fruits and berries such as prickly pear cactus and agave, nuts such as yak susí, and other edible plants like cactus and wild onions and beans. The adjacent grassland areas were primarily dotted with shrubs and cacti, as well as mesquite trees, which produce edible pods, and the common yucca plant; this area has greatly disturbed by modern human intervention, and its current formation of primarily being grassland with clusters of plants does not reflect its conditions several thousand years ago.

== Crop domestication ==
The earliest known evidence of the domestication of Cucurbita, which is native to the Americas, dates back 8,000–10,750 years BP, predating the domestication of other crops such as maize and beans in the region by about 4,000 years. This evidence was found in the Guilá Naquitz Cave and four other Mexican caves during a series of excavations in the 1960s, possibly beginning in 1959.

Local cultivation and limited horticulture were the primary methods for collecting vegetables and plants, and was the likely method of domestication for Curcurbita varieties. While the rainfall average was enough to sustain naturally growing crops, such as prickly pear cactus, agave, and wild beans, it was not enough to feasibly collect for irrigation or watering purposes for more complex farming and harvesting. Flannery et al. note that "winter crops cannot be grown” based on evapotranspiration models, indicating that these caves may have been a temporary or annual residence rather than a year-round place of residence. They also argued that the region’s steep slopes, thin soil, and lack of high water table meant that large- or even medium-scale farming would have been difficult, if not impossible, for the peoples living there at the times that they did, and in any groups larger than a single large family. Studies of cave and rock art from caves across Mexico, including in nearby regions to Guilá Naquitz, show depictions of deer, sheep, and bison, among other animals, implying some level of continued subsistence from hunted animals.

Early cultivation of certain wild vegetables in this localized area, in or near the Guilá Naquitz caves, dates back to around 8750 BC, based on seed and rind assemblages collected during various excavations. The primary vegetables examined for temporal study were Zea mays, common bean and squash. Radiocarbon dates show the presence of these three vegetables in human settlements as far back as 8000 BP and as recently as 700 AD. Study of cucurbita rinds shows the large range of time during which the caves were occupied: while 44% of the rinds date to around 700 AD, most fell into the Pre-Ceramic ranges (7400-6900 BC), with 4% dating as far back as 8750 BC. Based on temperature and ground quality, as well as the best observed growing conditions for various ‘’Cucurbita’’ gourds, the high presence of the specific species ‘’C. pepo’’ is consistent in the archaeological record and consistent with observance of a dry climate in central Mexico at that time.

Further excavations at the Guilá Naquitz site were carried out in the 1970s by a team led by Kent V. Flannery from the University of Michigan. Subsequent more accurate dating using accelerator mass spectrometers provided more specific dates. Solid evidence of domesticated C. pepo was found in the Guilá Naquitz Cave in the form of increasing rind thickness and larger peduncles in the newer stratification layers of the cave. By circa 8,000 years BP the C. pepo peduncles found are consistently more than 10 mm (0.39 in) thick. Wild Cucurbita peduncles are always below this 10 mm (0.39 in) barrier. Changes in fruit shape and color indicate intentional breeding of C. pepo occurred by no later than 8,000 years BP. During the same time frame, average rind thickness increased from 0.84 mm (0.033 in) to 1.15 mm (0.045 in).

=== Timeline of domesticate changes ===
The process to develop the agricultural knowledge of crop domestication took place over 5,000–6,500 years in Mesoamerica. Squash was domesticated first, with maize second and then beans being domesticated, becoming part of the Three Sisters agricultural system of companion planting.

Attempting to base the timeline of domestication on C. pepo remains has been difficult. 10,000 BP dates determined by earlier accelerated mass spectrometer (AMS) scans have been called into question by certain researchers, not for technical inaccuracy but for what those dates represent. Although the presence of cucurbita rinds has been interpreted as representing the time of transition between full hunter-gathering into horticulture or full agriculture, this date is too early for this transition to have happened, especially given that the assemblages for the next couple thousand years remain mostly the same: seed and rind assemblages, but not with evidence of natural exploitation of the land on the level of farming. The earliest evidence of human selection of C. pepo is argued to be at around 8000BP, though this date merely predicates, not implies, legitimate cultivational practices and is a predecessor to cultivational changes.

On the other hand, maize and teosinte provide a clearer time range. With what dates we have, we can determine that the sub-Tehaucán region may represent the earliest forms of cultivation and horticulture in Central America. The earliest dated maize cobs from the Tehuácan valley are around 4700 years BP, whereas Flannery and Piperno’s maize cobs from Guilá Naquitz date to 5,420 ± 60 and 5,410 ± 40 years BP, a difference of around 700 years to the previous oldest cobs. They further note that no older cobs have been found in the Tehuacán valley, which is north of the Guilá Naquitz cave system, meaning that the practice must have traveled north as it was established. Benz further corroborates this by examining physical changes occurring in teosinte and maize specimens by 5400 BP, such as their being more flexible and softer than wild teosinte, implying that these were traits selected for by the residents of the area and thus a physical example of early domestication and genetic selection for maize.

The Zea mays specimens found at Guilá Naquitz show the early stages of physical changes as the result of domestication:

- The primary trait that the inhabitants of the Guilá Naquitz cave selected for was “a rachis that did not naturally disarticulate” and would instead stick together as a single unit, or later as a cob. Once new generations of teosinte began to grow whose grains were better attached to the inflorescence, genetic selection for inflorescences and rachis with larger spikelets and eventually larger grains could begin. This change, from free disarticulation to non-disarticulation, shows clear genetic modification of maize in the region, even if it is a minor change.
- The inflorescences of the Guilá Naquitz cave maize cobs are distichous and occasionally polystichous, showing two to four rows of grain, unlike wild, pre-domesticate forms of teosinte, which grow in single-row rachis male stalks and distichous female stalks.
- In wild maize, each spikelet or kernel has a very rigid and thick glume that detaches easily, but is difficult to break open. Wild maize provides little nutritional support and very small edible portion. The cave samples’ glumes are shallower and thinner, allowing easier access to the grains. The cupules are also non-disarticulating,
- Wild maize cobs have small inflorescences, often with 10-12 grains on each rachis, providing enough seed material to pollinate and reproduce but not much to eat. This trait is most commonly selected for when selectively cultivating maize. Cultivated maize cobs showed larger inflorescences with more grains per rachis, suggesting early selection for particular traits.
