= Lithic stage =

Prehistoric period in the Americas

In the sequence of cultural stages first proposed for the archaeology of the Americas by Gordon Willey and Philip Phillips in 1958, the Lithic stage was the earliest period of human occupation in the Americas, as post-glacial hunter gatherers spread through the Americas. The stage derived its name from the first appearance of flaked stone tools. The term Paleo-Indian is an alternative, generally indicating much the same period.

This stage was conceived as embracing two major categories of the stone technology: (1) unspecialized and the largely unformulated core and flake industries, with percussion the dominant and perhaps only technique employed, and (2) industries exhibiting more advanced "blade" techniques of stoneworking, with specialized fluted or unfluted lanceolate points the most characteristic artifact types. Throughout South America, there are stone tool traditions of the lithic stage, such as the "fluted fishtail", that reflect localized adaptations to the diverse habitats of the continent.

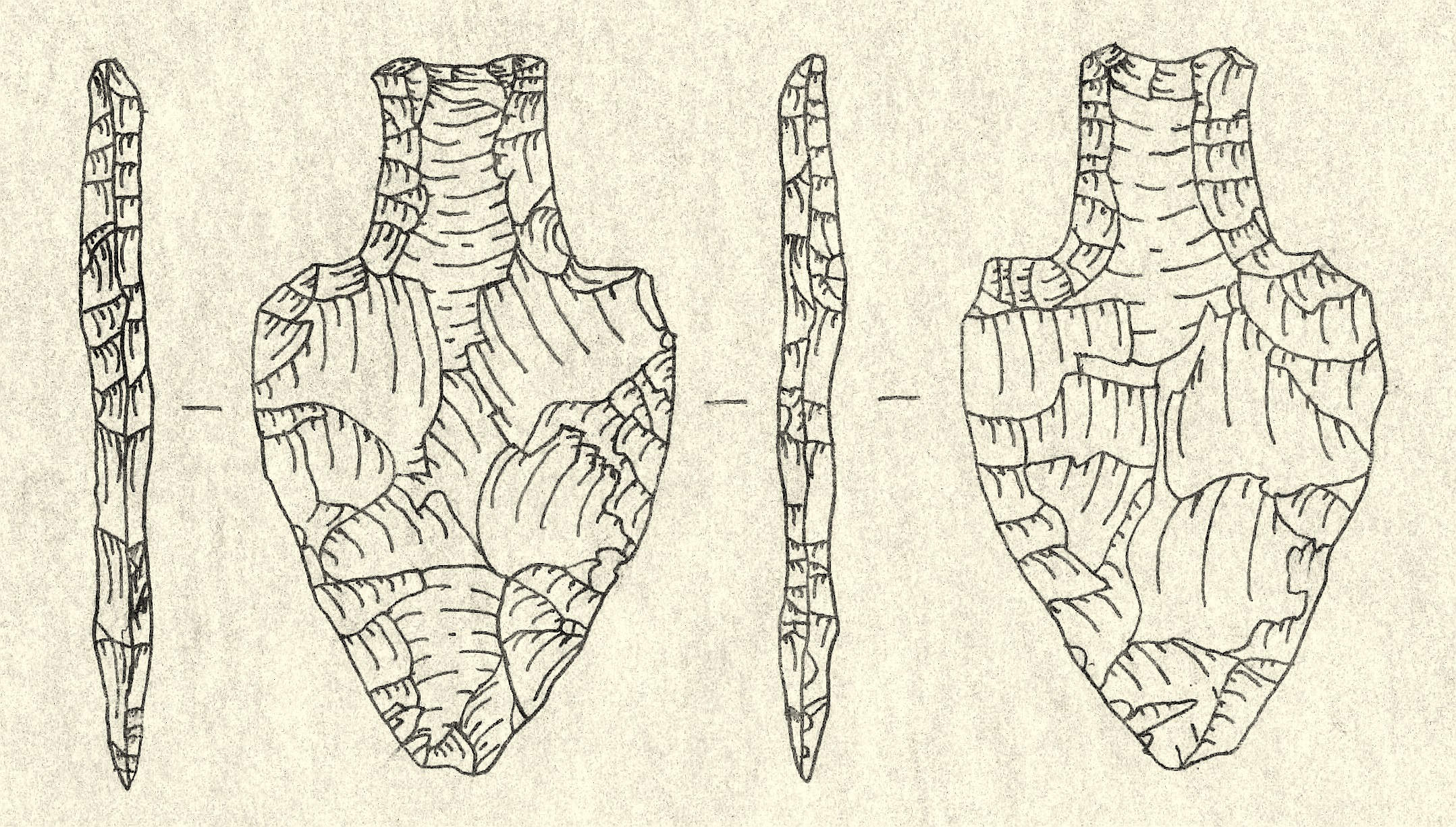
Stemmed fluted "Fishtail" point found in Belize

The indications and timing of the end of the Lithic stage vary between regions. The use of textiles, fired pottery, and start of the gradual replacement of hunter gatherer lifestyles with agriculture and domesticated animals would all be factors. End dates vary, but are around 5000 to 3000 BCE in many areas. The Archaic stage is the most widely used term for the succeeding stage, but in the periodization of pre-Columbian Peru, the Cotton Pre-Ceramic may be used. As in the Norte Chico civilization, cultivated cotton seems to have been very important in economic and power relations, from around 3200 BCE.

Archeologist Alex Krieger has documented hundreds of sites that have yielded crude, percussion-flaked tools. The most convincing evidence for a lithic stage is based upon data recovered from sites in South America, where such crude tools have been found and dated to more than 20,000 years ago.

In North America, the time encompasses the Paleo-Indian period, which subsequently is divided into more specific time terms, such as Early Lithic stage or Early Paleo-Indians, and Middle Paleo-Indians or Middle Lithic stage. Examples include the Clovis culture and Folsom tradition groups.

The Lithic stage was followed by the Archaic stage.

== Timeline ==
- 19000—21000 BP Humans present in the White Sands region of New Mexico.
- 14,802—13,708 BP: Charcoal collected from an ancient hearth on Triquet Island, British Columbia.
- 14,800-13,800 BP: A twenty-foot-long tent-like structure of wood and animal hides excavated from Monte Verde level II, Chile
- 12,340–10,800 BCEE: a stone-lined hearth and coprolites left in Paisley Caves, Oregon
- 11,300 BCE: Mound B of the LSU campus mounds was built.
- 10,200 BCE: Cooper Bison skull is painted with a red zigzag in present-day Oklahoma; it is the oldest known painted object in North America.

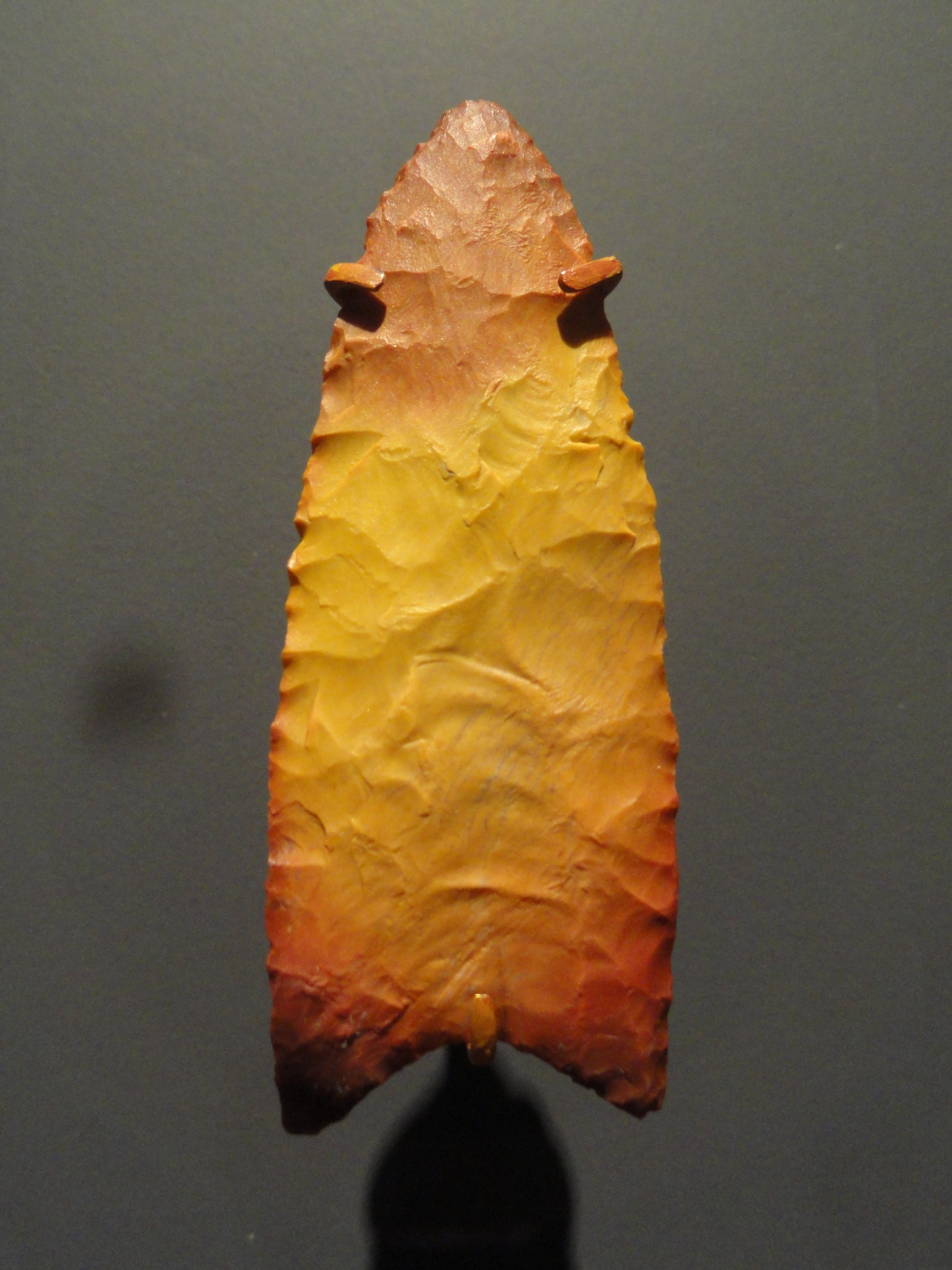
A Clovis point from Utah, dated to 11500–9000 BC.

- 9500 BCE: Cordilleran and Laurentide Ice Sheets retreat enough to open a habitable ice-free corridor through the northern half of the continent along the eastern flank of the Rocky Mountains.
- 9500 BCE: People craft early Clovis spear points, knives, and skin scrapers from rock in New Mexico.
- 9250–8950 BCE: Clovis points – thin, fluted projectile points created using bifacial percussion flaking – are created by Clovis culture peoples in the Plains and Southwestern North America.
- 9001 BCE: Archaeological materials found on the Channel Islands of California and in coastal Peru.
- 9000 BCE: Archaeological materials found on Channel Islands off the California coast
- 9000 BCE: First settlers arrive in the Great Basin with its cool, wet prevailing climate
- 9000–8900 BCE: The Folsom culture in New Mexico leaves bison bones and stone spear points.
- 8700 BCE: Human settlement reaches the Northwestern Plateau region.
- 8000 BCE: The last glacial ends, causing sea levels to rise and flood the Beringia land bridge, closing the primary migration route from Siberia.
- 8000 BCE: Sufficient rain falls on the American Southwest to support many large mammal species – mammoth, mastodon, and bison – that soon go extinct.
- 8000 BCE: Native Americans leave documented traces of their presence in every habitable corner of the Americas, including the American Northeast, the Pacific Northwest, and a cave on Prince of Wales Island in the Alexander archipelago of southeast Alaska, possibly following these game animals.

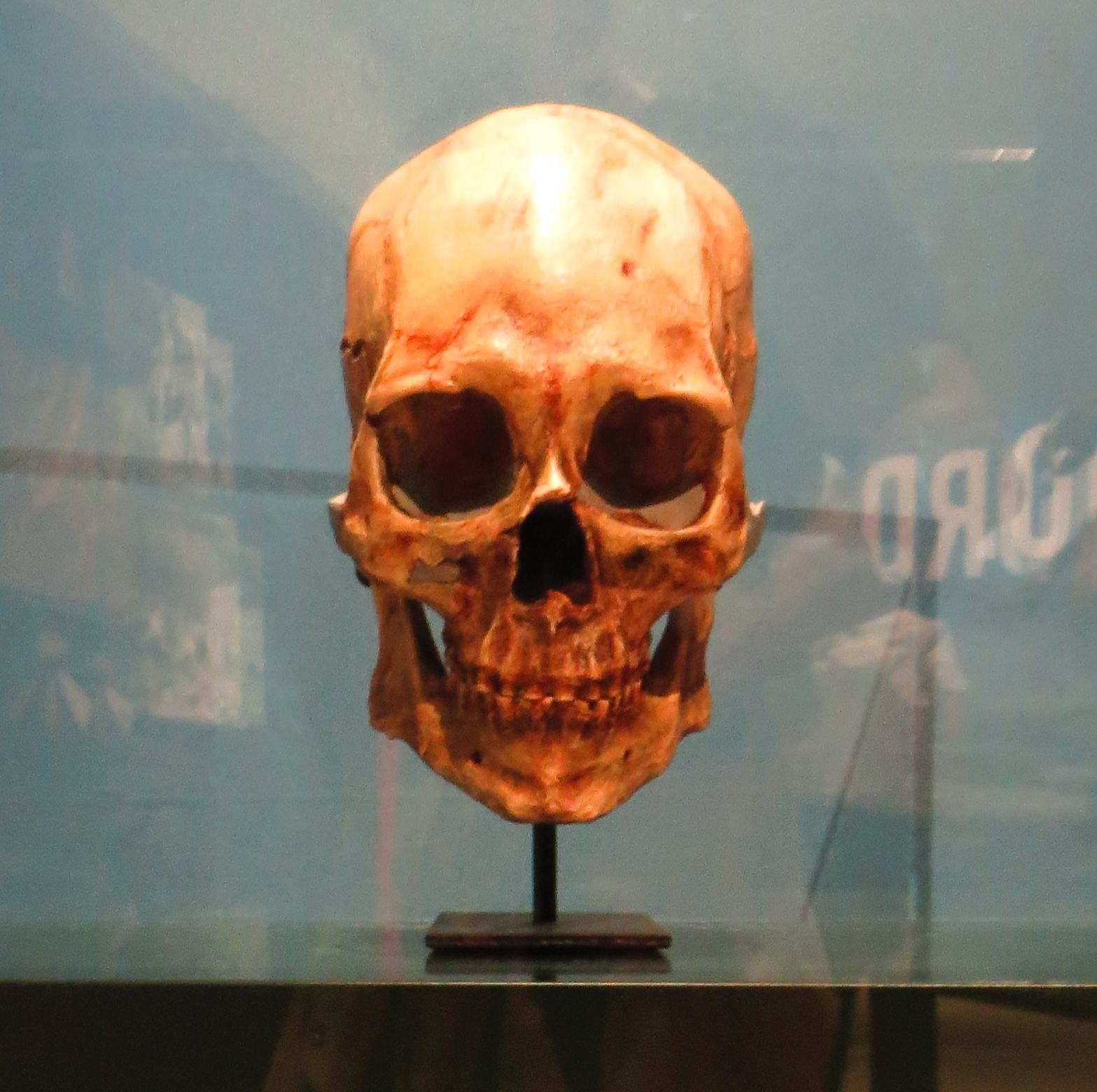
Kennewick Man

Times from the 8000 BCE to about 3000 BCE may be classified as part of the lithic stage or of an archaic stage, depending on authority and on region.

- 7500 BCE: Early basketry.
- 7560–7370 BCE: Kennewick Man dies along the shore of the Columbia River in Washington state; his remains were one of the most complete early Native American skeletons.
- 7000 BCE: Northeastern peoples depend increasingly on deer, nuts, and wild grains as the climate warms.
- 7000 BCE: Native Americans in Lahontan Basin, Nevada mummify their dead to give them honor and respect, expressing deep concern about their treatment and condition.
- 6500 BCE–200 CE: The San Dieguito–Pinto tradition and Chihuahua tradition flourish in southern California, the Southwest, and northwestern Mexico.
- 6000 BCE: Ancestors of Penutian-speaking peoples settle in the Northwestern Plateau.
- 6000 BCE: Nomadic hunting bands roam Subarctic Alaska following herds of caribou and other game animals.
- 6000 BCE: Aleuts begin to settle the Aleutian Islands.
- 5700 BCE: Cataclysmic eruption of Mount Mazama in Oregon.
- 5500 BCE–500 CE Oshara tradition, a Southwestern Archaic tradition, arises in north-central New Mexico, the San Juan Basin, the Rio Grande Valley, southern Colorado, and southeastern Utah.
- Natives of the Northwestern Plateau begin to rely on salmon runs.
- 5000 BCE: Early cultivation of food crops began in Mesoamerica.
- 5000 BCE: Native Americans in the Pacific Northwest from Alaska to California develop a fishing economy, with salmon as a staple.
- 5000 BCE: The Old Copper Culture of the Great Lakes area hammers the metal into various tools and ornaments, such as knives, axes, awls, bracelets, rings, and pendants.

== See also ==
Elsewhere

- Lithic period in Mesoamerica
- Lithic period in Belize

Other

- Archaeology of the Americas
- Indigenous Amerindian genetics
