= Raised field =

Large cultivated elevation

In agriculture, a raised field is a large, cultivated elevation, typically bounded by water-filled ditches, that is used to allow cultivators to control environmental factors such as moisture levels, frost damage, and flooding. Examples of raised field agriculture can be found among some Pre-Hispanic cultures of Latin America, such as those from tropical lowlands and the Budi Lake Mapuche.

Pre-Hispanic raised fields are known from the region near Santa Cruz de Mompox in northern Colombia and in the Llanos de Moxos region of lowland Bolivia. In highland Bolivia, where this was utilized by the Tiwanaku culture near Lake Titicaca, this technique is known as Waru Waru or camellones. Ancient raised-field agriculture has also been documented in Central America at Pulltrouser Swamp in Belize, where it was practiced by the Maya civilization. Toltec and Aztec people also practiced raised-field agriculture on the shore of Lake Texcoco, where these fields were known as chinampas.
