= Pulltrouser Swamp =

Archaeological site in northern Belize

- Pull Trouser Swamp
- 18.16687°N 88.56666°W
- Periods: Preceramic
- Cultures: Palaeoindian; Mayan
- Location: Orange Walk, Belize
- Region: Yucatan Peninsula

Pulltrouser Swamp is a wetland area located in northern Belize, between the New River (Belize) and Hondo River (Belize). This area contains numerous archaeological sites belonging to the Maya civilization, the most studied features of which are the raised field structures. Three of these sites, called Raised-Field Site I, Raised-Field Site 2, and Raised-Field site 3, were excavated by archaeologists B.L. Turner and Peter D. Harrison.

== Settlements ==
Located north of Orange Walk in Belize is a Y-shaped settlement that makes up a series of complex elongated depressions. In Pulltrouser there were three different immediate settlements that surrounded the swamp equalling 8.5 km. In these settlements the key to organization was the utilization of hillsides and slopes for the raised fields. The people of Pulltrouser built their small living structures on terraces 2–3 meters above the swamp. There was also a hard platform composed of hard limestone and plaster built within the housing structure area. Within the settlement areas there was evidence of both ceramic and stone artifact production and use.

== Environment ==
There are four different vegetation types that occur at Pulltrouser Swamp; botan forest, escoba forest, saw grass community and grass savannah. Each of these appears to be spatially related to fluctuations of water in the area.

- Botan forest – This area is similar to the escoba forest but with the addition of some sabal species and nearly twice as many trees per square meter. Botan forest also has a greater range of tree sizes. The two types of forest are associated with different moisture levels in the soil, the soil that supports escoba forest maintains its moisture content throughout the year while the soil beneath botan forest experiences a decrease during the dry season.
- Escoba forest – This area is characterized by leguminous trees and shrubs as well as palms that can grow as tall as seventeen meters. Three vegetation layers have been identified; an upper tree layer (15-17m), a second layer of palms and saplings (8-10m) and a weakly developed herb layer (1-3m)
- Saw grass – Dominated by dense grasses and sedges of the tussock variety. Grasses can reach a height of up to two meters near the escoba forest zone. The density of the vegetation allows the soil below to remain saturated despite being fully exposed to the sun.
- Grass savannah – Vegetation consists of an herb cover of grasses and sedges with scattered savannah trees. The areas experiences a dramatic change in moisture content throughout the year and at its driest the vegetation can dry out. This area is used for cattle grazing during the dry season.

The botan and escoba forest have been expanded as a result of the construction of fields and canals. Logging that has taken place over the last three hundred years has also altered the landscape and vegetation of the depression. The saw grass zone occurs at the center surrounded by the escoba then botan forest respectively. The grass savannah occurs in the western portion of the swamp.

During construction of the canals and raised field system, it is believed Pulltrouser was simply a wet, non-forested area containing large amounts of water lilies. However, raised fields were constructed in marshlike environments since they are easier to channelize to construct raised fields. Archaeobotanical evidence suggests that several arboreal crops such as hog plum and avocado were evident at Pulltrouser Swamp as well as other evidence including maize and cotton. Pineapple, tobacco, vanilla were also found at the swamp most likely for the easy transportability and market value.

== Agriculture ==
People likely settled around swamps because of the rich faunal, plant, soil and water resources this environment made available. Maize appears at the site around 890 cal BP. Pollen records show mass forest disturbance around 2500 B.C., this coincides with the appearance of maize pollen, a decline in tree pollen and an increase in charcoal. This is evidence for a rapid and extensive expansion of agriculture with maize as an important crop. Further charcoal indicates that agriculture was expanded in the area between 1500 and 1300 B.C. and squash and bottle gourd were cultivated as well as maize. Evidence of what was originally thought to be canals at the site were found to be natural hummocks with no evidence of excavation. Pohl et al. (1996) suggest that the adoption of wetland agriculture was not a response to increases in population growth that created the need for more resources but instead a reaction to the changes in groundwater levels they believe to have occurred around 1500–1300 B.C.

=== Raised fields ===
Aerial photography of ground patterns in Pulltrouser swamp has revealed that the Maya were utilising raised field agriculture in the area. Raised field agriculture is a form of hydraulic cultivation using raised and canalized fields creating conditions in which the earth is above its natural height. It has been suggested that these fields were in use from 400 BC-600AD, however this date could be biased due to repositioning of artifacts during the shifting of material in construction. The Pulltrouser swamp sites are often used as representative of this agricultural type in interpretations of the use of raised-field agriculture in Maya culture. The investigations at the site have involved both coring and excavations.

There are two distinct ground patterns observed in Pulltrouser: "quadrilateral shapes in paired rows and quadrilateral to amorphous shapes in sectional or group patterns". There are approximately 311ha of well-defined patterns located along the mainland edge, which have been measured to be 1m above the surrounding depressions. There are also 357 ha of less distinct patterns seen in both the East and West interiors of the site. Running around these platforms are systems of different sized canals. There are three main categories of canals:

- Large (7-10m wide): These canals connect segments of the field
- Medium (4m wide): These canals encompass the majority of the fields
- Small (2-3m wide): These canals are mainly cut into the mainland

However, there is evidence of a fourth category, "extra-large canals" which run 200m long and 6-8m wide between South Pulltrouser and the New River, which have the suggested purposes of either controlling water-levels or being part of a transport system.

Within the fields, the plant remains (phytoliths and pollen, for example) recovered help create a clearer picture of Mayan raised field agriculture in Pulltrouser. Maize was recovered in the form of pollen as well as a carbonized stalk found in one of the platforms. It is possible that this could be evidence of maize as agricultural crop or it could have been from mulch to aid the growth of other crops. Gosypium pollen was also recovered, which may represent either domesticated cotton or a wild population. The presence of water lily phytoliths suggests that there was permanent water in the canals during construction and/or use of the fields. It has been suggested that these water lilies may have been used as mulch, as modern day experiments show that water lily mulch is effective in retaining moisture, providing nutrients and other benefits. Unfortunately not enough organic material was recovered to conclusively show which crops or plants the Maya were using Pulltrouser Swamp for.

Based on profiles, sediments and other information produced by excavation on the fields, Turner and Harrison propose that the raised fields were created using the following steps:

1. Creating a depression- In this step the soil is removed from the area and stored for later use, as the canals are cut into the earth removing subsoil material.
2. Buildup of the field foundations- In this step the subsoil materials that were taken out of the ground to form the canals is now deposited on the area where the field will be (in between the canals). This build of material is generally built up to 200 cm above the bottom of canals.
3. Fertile Soil- The original top soil that was first removed in the first stage is now added on top of the subsoil field foundations along with top soils taken from other areas and organics added for planting mediums.
4. Planting and Use- The crops are then planted, grown, tended and harvested from the raised field platforms.

== Ceramics ==
Much of the sample ceramics recovered at Pulltrouser Swamp are too small to clearly establish ceramic sequence or detailed understandings. However, there is some useful information that can be gained from the ceramics that were found. There is a presence of Early and Moderate Classic sherds (pieces) that are mixed and disturbed. The pottery style of the few specimens (bowls and vessels) that could be identified is linked to coastal sites in Belize and sites from Becan to Lake Bakalar. The sites from Becan to Lake Bakalar are also sites where raised field agriculture is prevalent.

== Stone tools ==
The stone tools (or "lithics") at Pulltrouser Swamp suggest that their use was during occupation of the site from the Late Preclassic to Late Classic Period (see Mesoamerican chronology). The tools found at the site were mostly for agricultural use or manufacturing agricultural products. There is little evidence that any of the tools were manufactured at the site. The types of tools found consisted of oval bifaces, tranchet bits, celts, picks, beveled bits, blades, and hammer stones. The majority of the tools are made from chert with some of chalcedony, cherty-limestone and obsidian. The oval bifaces are made from chert sourced near the site of Colha, Belize; these tools have wear consistent with agricultural work and were most likely used as hoes. The tranchet bits arrived fully formed at Pulltrouser, although there is evidence of retouching at the site. There are also blades made of chalcedony, stemmed knives and battered tools, sixteen of them made from chalcedony and two of cherty-limestone. Obsidian tools were mostly prismatic blades that were made from abraded surfaces and were sourced from Guatemala. The lithics found at Pulltrouser suggest extensive trade with nearby sites, since there is little evidence of manufacturing at the site. In addition, many of the chert tools were recycled and reused suggesting that these items were highly valued.

== Molluscs ==
At the excavated sites within Pulltrouser Swamp there are many different species of mollusc shell types found. There were also many different uses; the most prominent shells being mixed terrestrial gastropods that were used in construction materials as fill in the raised fields. Some of the different species and their uses include: Melongena melongena, used as a major food source. Pachychilus, used as a supplementary food source. The shells were a source of powdered lime used when cooking maize. Strombus gigas, used as a major food source. Larger shells were used for hoes as well as worked into ornaments or utensils.
