= Colha, Belize =

Maya archaeological site in Belize

Colha, Belize is a Maya archaeological site located in northern portion of the country, about 52 km. north of Belize City, near the town of Orange Walk. The site is one of the earliest in the Maya region and remains important to the archaeological record of the Maya culture well into the Postclassic Period. According to Palma Buttles, “Archaeological evidence from Colha allows for the interpretation occupation from the Early Preceramic (3400-1900B.C.) to Middle Postclassic (A.D. 1150-1300) with population peaks occurring in the Late Preclassic (400B.C.- A.D. 100) and again in the Late Classic ( A.D. 600-850)”. These peaks in population are directly related to the presence of stone tool workshops at the site. Colha's proximity to an important source of high quality chert that is found in the Cenozoic limestone of the region and well traveled trade routes was utilized by the inhabitants to develop a niche in the Maya trade market that may have extended to the Greater Antilles. During the Late Preclassic and Late Classic periods, Colha served as a primary supplier of worked stone tools for the region. It has been estimated that the 36 workshops at Colha produced nearly 4 million chert and obsidian tools and eccentrics that were dispersed throughout Mesoamerica during the Maya era. This made it an important player in the trade of essential good throughout the area.

== Archaeological history ==
The first archaeological excavations at Colha were in 1973. As part of the British Museum-Cambridge University Corozal Project, Norman Hammond mapped, named, tested, and reported the site for the first time In 1975, Hammond returned to Colha for further investigations which uncovered large deposits of lithic production debitage and showed that the site had a long history of occupation. At the 1976 Maya Lithic Conference, a discussion on the possible importance of Colha in the archaeological discussion of Maya lithics and craft specialization prompted a call for a long term investigation at the site. It was decided that Thomas R. Hester and Harry J. Shafer should be in charge of this project due to their experience with lithics. The result was a 14-year project by Hester, Shafer, and colleagues under the auspices of the University of Texas at Austin's Colha Project (discussed below).

Important contributors to the knowledge and publications available on Colha include (alphabetically, not by importance); Richard E.W. Adams, Dana Anthony, Jaime Awe, Palma Buttles, Meredith Dreiss, Jack D. Eaton, James T. Escobedo Jr., Lawrence H. Feldman, Eric C. Gibson, Thomas R. Hester, Harry B. Iceland, John S. Jacob, John G. Jones, Thomas C. Kelly, Eleanor M. King, Jon C. Lohse, Virginia K. Massey, Marilyn A. Masson, Roberta McGregor, Richard Meadows, Frances Meskill, George H. Michaels, Shirley B. Mock, Daniel R. Potter, Ketherine V. Reese, Erwin Roemer, Robert F. Scott IV, Harry J. Shafer, Leslie C. Shaw, Janet Stock, Lauren A. Sullivan, A.J. Taylor, Fred Valdez Jr., Richard r. Wilk, and Lori Wright.

=== The Colha Project ===
The Colha Project is a long running dig at and around Colha. The project began in 1979 with an extensive investigation of the lithic production sites noted by Hammond and his associates, under the direction of Thomas Hester, Harry Shafer, and Robert Heizer. Highlights from this season included the development of quadrants and numbering schemes, the beginning of a regional survey program, and the outlining of a preliminary ceramic chronology by Adams and Valdez. The 1980 season confirmed that Colha was an important center for the production of lithics for the area and the formalization of the regional survey under the title, Colha Regional Survey(CRS). The CRS program was important in the locating of several preceramic sites in Northern Belize including; Ladyville, Lowe Ranch, and Sand Hill. The following season, 1980, contributed significant information about how control and distribution of Colha lithics was managed at the site and accommodated the establishment of a detailed lithic chronology for the region, by the end of the 1981 season. Excavations in 1983 were the most expansive in the number of people and area covered of all the years of the Colha Project and covered several aspects of the site in the Preclassic and the transition from the Classic to the Postclassic. the latter being the subject again in 1984. 1985 saw no work of the Colha Project, but 1986 saw a return to this transition with a greater influence on expanding the knowledge on the Late Classic, especially as it pertained to Lithic production. In 1987, while research continued on the 1986 studies, a new emphasis was developed on the Preceramic Period. Operation 4046 located off mound at the edge of an aguada recovered lithic tools and debitage from the Preceramic period. Investigations at 4046 continued during brief investigations in 1988 and recovered additional lithic material below the Maya ceramic zone. 1989 saw the first inclusion of a field school from the University of Texas at Austin under the direction of Fred Valdez Jr. The research centered around preclassic deposits at Operation 2031, while John Jacob's important soil coring project started in the adjacent Cobweb Swamp. Jacobs work was the main focus in 1990, but in 1991 attention turned back to the preceramic and operation 4046 through Valdez's second Colha field school.

== Formative Period ==
In Belize, there is sparse evidence for occupation during the Archaic period before 3400 B.C. This date has been used in conjunction with the Colha chronology, introduced by Iceland (1997), to outline the delineation of the Late Archaic period (3400-900B.C.). This period seems to have been a time of temporary settlement and selective adaptation through agriculture, with most sites located near easily attained natural recourses and adjacent to "swamp and lagoon margins, river valleys, near-coastal areas, upland settings along ecotonal boundaries, rockshelters, and caves". Despite the understanding of where to look for these evidences, concrete habitation sites for this period have been illusive to archaeologists, who must rely heavily on lithics and pollen studies to reconstruct the settlement patterns for the Late Archaic in Belize. Colha falls in an area of one particularly important natural resource, chert, and is very near to Cobweb Swamp. Therefore it was an optimal area to search for evidence of Late Archaic evidence in Belize. On this assumption, Thomas Hester and Harry Shafer dedicated the 1993-1995 Colha Project field seasons toward the investigation of the Late Archaic near Colha.

In his 1997 Ph.D. Dissertation, Harry Iceland put together a compilation of 23 calibrated radio-carbon dates from between 3400 B.C. and 900 B.C. that demonstrated regular utilization of the site throughout the Late Archaic, with the exception of a gap between 1900 B.C. and 1500 B.C., when the site is presumed to be empty. This chronology was supported by the pollen data from Cobweb Swamp. In his dissertation, Jones (1994) suggests that manioc and maize were being cultivated by the people of Colha at Cobweb Swamp. Jones documented evidence that "early human forest modification, disturbance and domesticated plant cultivation was established for the period prior to 2,500 B.C. (or nearly 1500 years before any other Maya site).

Another tool used for the investigation of Late Archaic period Colha is lithic type analysis. Macroblades, microblades, pointed unifaces, and other specific lithic types have been noted for Colha and used to extrapolate dating for the region. Early entrants into the lithics record at Colha include Lowe points and Sawmill points. Both of these points are found predominantly between Colha and Ladyville. A shift in lithics is seen at around 1500 B.C. just as the hiatus ends. Iceland calls this period (1500 B.C. -900B.C.)the Late Preceramic based on radiocarbon dating of the associated assemblage. He further demonstrates how this shift is indicative of a shift in agricultural strategies. The most diagnostic tool in the Late Preceramic assemblage is a distinctive type of uniface that appears to have been used for extensive clearing of land for farming.

== Preclassic Period Colha ==
There are three generally recognized phases in Preclassic Period (900 B.C. – A.D. 250) Colha. These are:

1. Middle Preclassic (900-400 B.C.),
2. Late Preclassic (400 B.C. – A.D. 100), and
3. Protoclassic (A.D. 100-250).

During this period a general pattern of development is evident at the site through evidence of increasing complexity, socially, culturally and economically.

Despite evidence of periodic utilization in the Preceramic (Formative) Period through pollen analysis at nearby Cobweb Swamp and debitage from lithic utilization around the site as far back as the Paleolithic, the first evidence of settled Maya through architectural means at Colha comes in the Early to Middle Preclassic Period.

=== Middle Preclassic Colha (900-400B.C.) ===
The early portion of the Middle Preclassic, as the inception of permanent settlement in Colha, was characterized by small households that are dispersed throughout the site and the Bolay Complex of ceramics (found primarily in caches), with evidence of wetland agriculture and "garden hunting" in nearby Cobweb Swamp as a subsistence strategy The community of Colha quickly progressed from there. According to Buttles,

"By the Late Middle Preclassic (600 - 400B.C.), Chiwa complex (or Mamom phase) settlement patterns suggest that the series of interactive households became unified and probably represented a low-level chiefdom society".

Additionally, the first signs of the importing of raw materials and goods from afar appear in the Middle Preclassic. This is suggested to be evidence of the development of long distance trade and causal for the expansion of Colha in population and prestige. Middle Preclassic architecture is dominated by low-walled circular structures built on middens. These would have supported perishable superstructures.

=== Late Preclassic Colha (400B.C.-A.D.100) ===
Further increases in population and complexity are evident in the Late Preclassic, at Colha. The site grew to an estimated population of 600 during this period and began to construct its first monumental architecture, in the form of formal plazas, temples, and a ballcourt. This suggests that Colha had developed social stratification and may have been independent or semi-independent. To support this growth, Colha further developed its system of raised fields at Cobweb Swamp and expanded its lithic production specialization, in scale and types of lithics produced (i.e. stemmed macroblades and bifacial symbolic flaked stones) to become a center of importance in the region. Hester and Shafer document that as many as 36 workshops are present during this period. While domestic structures remained architecturally similar, some did increase in size during the Late Preclassic. Burials become more frequent in this period and the contents show more diverse contents, especially as it pertains to imported items.

=== Protoclassic Period Colha (A.D. 100-250) ===
The Protoclassic Period, sometimes referred to as the Terminal Preclassic, at Colha is a time of change in ceramics and patterns found in Colha's material culture. The Blossom Red complex is indicative of this transitional period and is dominated by Sierra Red ceramics, although several other types (San Filipe, Chactoc, and Sarteneja) make up part of the complex. At least two buildings have been attributed to the Protoclassic Period and these have demonstrated a shift in layout from the apsidal form of earlier periods toward the square/rectangular form that is found in the Classic Period. Anthony suggests that these structures may have been used for ritual purposes, as evidenced by the use of extensive caching at structure 2012. Caches for the Protoclassic tend to be in lip-to-lip pottery vessels and include an important cache of blood letting paraphernalia. This ritual evidence may coincide with the first observations of mathematics and writing at Colha, which includes glyphs incised into one of these cache vessels.

== Classic Period ==
The classic period represents a time of fluctuation in population and power for Colha. Three occupational phases are recognized at Colha during the classic period. Each has an associated ceramic complex. The Early Classic (A.D. 250-600) is associated with the Cobweb complex. The Late Classic (A.D. 600-700)is associated with the Bomba complex. And, the Terminal Classic (A.D. 700-875) is associated with the Masson complex.

=== Early Classic Colha(A.D. 250-600) ===
According to Buttles, "During the Early Classic Cobweb complex are apparent decreases in population, lithic production, settlement patterns, mortuary practices, and in general, material culture". While Cobweb complex ceramics are found throughout the site, the assemblage is the smallest numerically of the complexes associated with Colha and there have been no lithics workshops attributed to this period at the site. The latter may be an indication of the growing importance of lithic workshops at Altun Ha, Belize and indicative of a shift in political power in the region.

=== Late Classic Colha(A.D.600-700) ===
Despite the noted reduction and size and importance during the Early classic, Colha may have reached its fluorescence during the Late Classic. According to Jack Eaton, Late Classic Colha may have grown to a population of nearly 1,000 people in its epicenter and 4,000 within a six square kilometer area. Consequently, a majority of architectural remains, both public and domestic are erected in the late Classic and there is a large increase in the number of raised fields found at Cobweb Swamp during this period. However, while evidence of ritual caching return, they do not reach the levels found in the Late Preclassic or Protoclassic and the quantity of imported prestige artifacts is less than found during these previous times. Lithics, on the other hand, return to prominence at this time, but the control and distribution of these throughout the site shifts considerably. In number, lithics workshops of the Late Classic exceed the Preclassic or Protoclassic. However, their distribution is spread throughout the site and seem to be more independent of state control at this time. These household workshops seem to specialize what they are creating and how they are creating these lithics.

=== Terminal Classic Colha(A.D. 700-875) ===
In terms of material culture it is difficult to differentiate between the Terminal Classic and Late Classic. On exception to this may be seen in a shift in lithic assemblages and ceramics toward a style that is influenced by major sites on the Yucatan. Valdez sees this shift in the inclusion of Petkanche Orange polychrome ceramics in the Masson complex and the appearance trade wares from the Yucatan (Ticul Thin Slate ceramics). While others note the specialization in smaller stemmed blades to indicate this shift through the adoption of atlatl technology and/or the increased demand for these points in the export market to accommodate an increase in Maya warfare. According to Buttles, this shift "suggests changes in cultural and political interaction spheres".

The end of the Classic period may be seen through the cessation of maintenance of building 2012 and through a unique deposit at operation 2011. While building 2012 shows some evidence of continued use through the Terminal Classic construction of two small shrines at its base, buildings 2011 and 2025, both ceremonial in nature, appear to have been burnt. Within operation 2011, an 80 cm by 110 cm pit was found in the 1980 field season and dates to between A.D. 659 and A.D. 782. It contained skulls of 10 men, 10 women, and 10 children. These had been removed through decapitation and burnt. Massey notes that the skulls in the skull pit were likely those of elite citizens as evidenced by their cranial shaping and filled teeth.

== Postclassic Period ==
After the Classic period, Colha seems to be abandoned for a short time. According to Buttles, "following the apparent violent end of Colha during the Terminal Classic the site remained unoccupied for a period of 50-100 years until around A.D.950". This hiatus is evident in the pollen analysis of the surrounding area and the lack of construction at the site. Colha's Hiatus allowed a regeneration of the environment, something that has been suggested as a causal factor in the sites reoccupation in the Early Postclassic period. The impetus for the re-occupation has also been inferred to be the site's location in the vicinity of the chert bearing lands, as evidenced by the 12 lithics workshops attributed to the Postclassic. Hester and Shafer further note that the lithics produced in these workshops were made from more than the local chert. Imported chalcedony and large amount of obsidian (relative to previous occupations) are important sources of worked stone in Postclassic Colha and new forms like the "side-notched dart points" are evident at this time. However, Colha of the Postclassic was likely a small society of agrarian farmers who used lithic production to either supplement their subsistence or to serve a greater polity in the Yucatan. The agrarian subsistence strategy of choice for the people who re-occupy Colha seems to be a type of tree cropping. Consider the following excerpt from Buttles (2002):

Subsistence strategies may be best revealed through the paleobotanical and faunal remains. The paleobotanical data recovered from Operations 2001 and 2010 indicate the use of a variety of cultigens and tree cropping including maize (Zea mays), beans (Phaseolus vulgariz), cotton (Gossypium hirstum)achiote or annatto (Bixa orellana), bitter gourd (Momordia sp.), jauacte palm (Bactis major), epiphytic cactus (Slenecereus sp), supa (Acrocomia mexican), chicle (Achras zapota), papaya (Carica papya), and custard apple (Annona reticulata)(Caldwell 1980:261; Miksicek 1979:158)".

This re-occupation has been suggested to be by a group with strong ties to the Yucatan and significantly different material culture than those who occupied Colha before the hiatus and no monumental architecture. After A.D.950, the site is occupied throughout the remainder of the Postclassic. Three ceramic complexes are directly correlated to certain periods during the Postclassic; the Yalam complex to the Early Postclassic (A.D.950-1250), the Canos complex to the Middle Postclassic (A.D.1250-1300), and the Ranas complex to the Late Postclassic (A.D.1300-1400). The Yalam and Canos complexes are complete, but the Ranas complex seems to only reflect an influx of "Mayapan-style (visitation) censers".

== See also ==
- Cuello
