= Plazuela República =

Plaza in Mazatlán

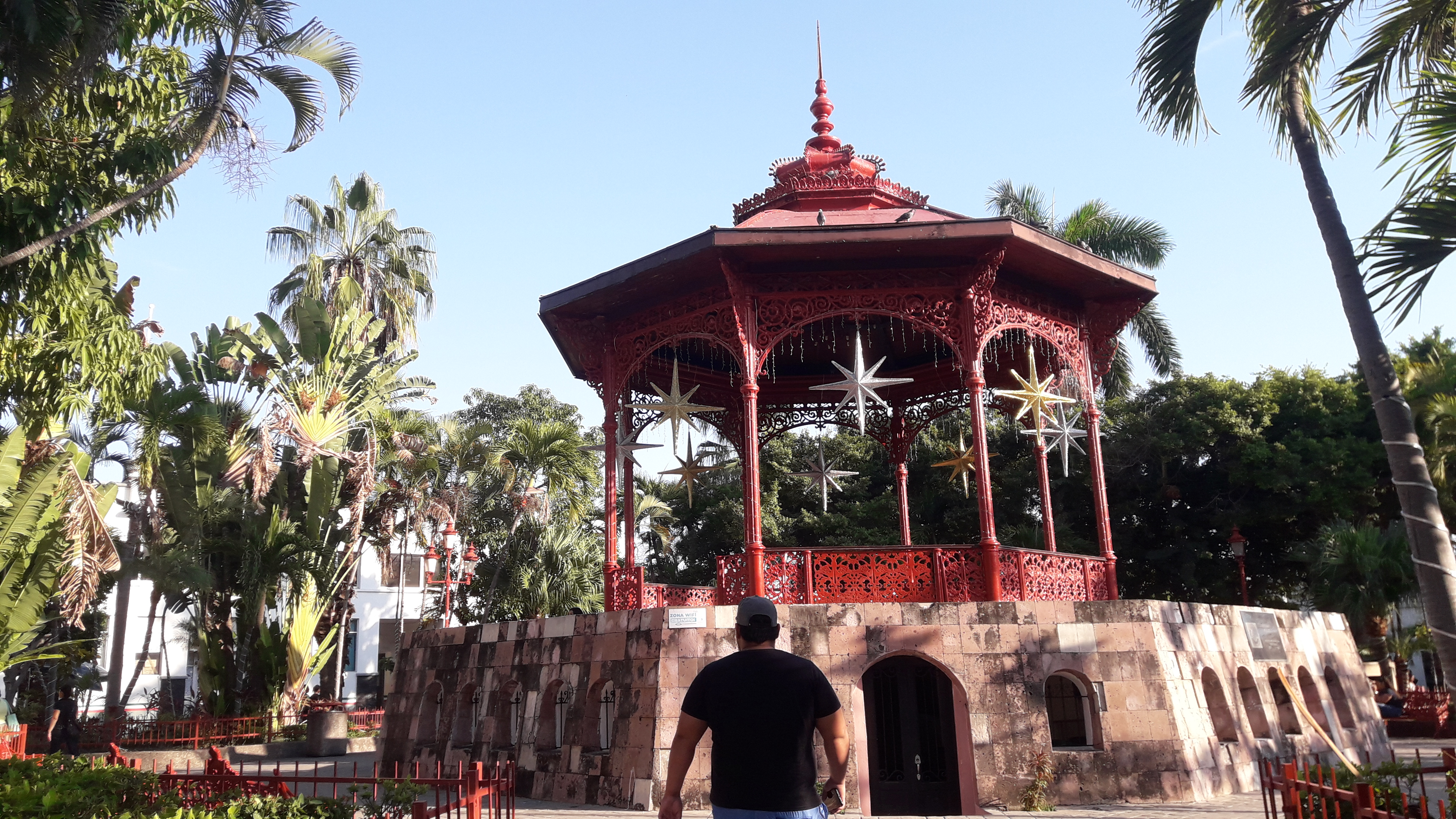
- Plazuela República in 2022
- Interactive map of Plazuela República
- Type: Public park
- Location: Mazatlán, Mexico
- Coordinates: 23.200280°N 106.421793°W
- Open: Year-round
- Status: Existing
- Website: tics.mazatlan.gob.mx/tourist/es/sitios-interes/detalle/44

The Plazuela República (Plaza Revolución) is a public park in Mazatlán, Mexico. It sits next to the municipal palace and in front of the Cathedral.

== History ==
Originally it was the main square of the port. It was the home of the municipal market from 1865 to 1900. The Pino Suaréz Market later replaced it. The square was built in 1870 on an esplanade surrounded by commercial posts. In 1909, the German Melchers family donated a kiosk placed in the center. Its style is French with a Gothic tendency to balance the Cathedral. The facade hosts a plaque with the name "Plaza Revolución", referring to the plaza's reconstruction from 1945 to 1947. The base was used as a cafeteria from 1946, although it no longer provides service. Currently the square is a daily meeting place for families, as well as the place of the cry for independence every September 16, accompanied by a festival. On Sundays, a Municipal Hour is celebrated in which artists perform. On January 9, 2016, this celebration returned to the square after a 6-year absence.

== Gallery ==
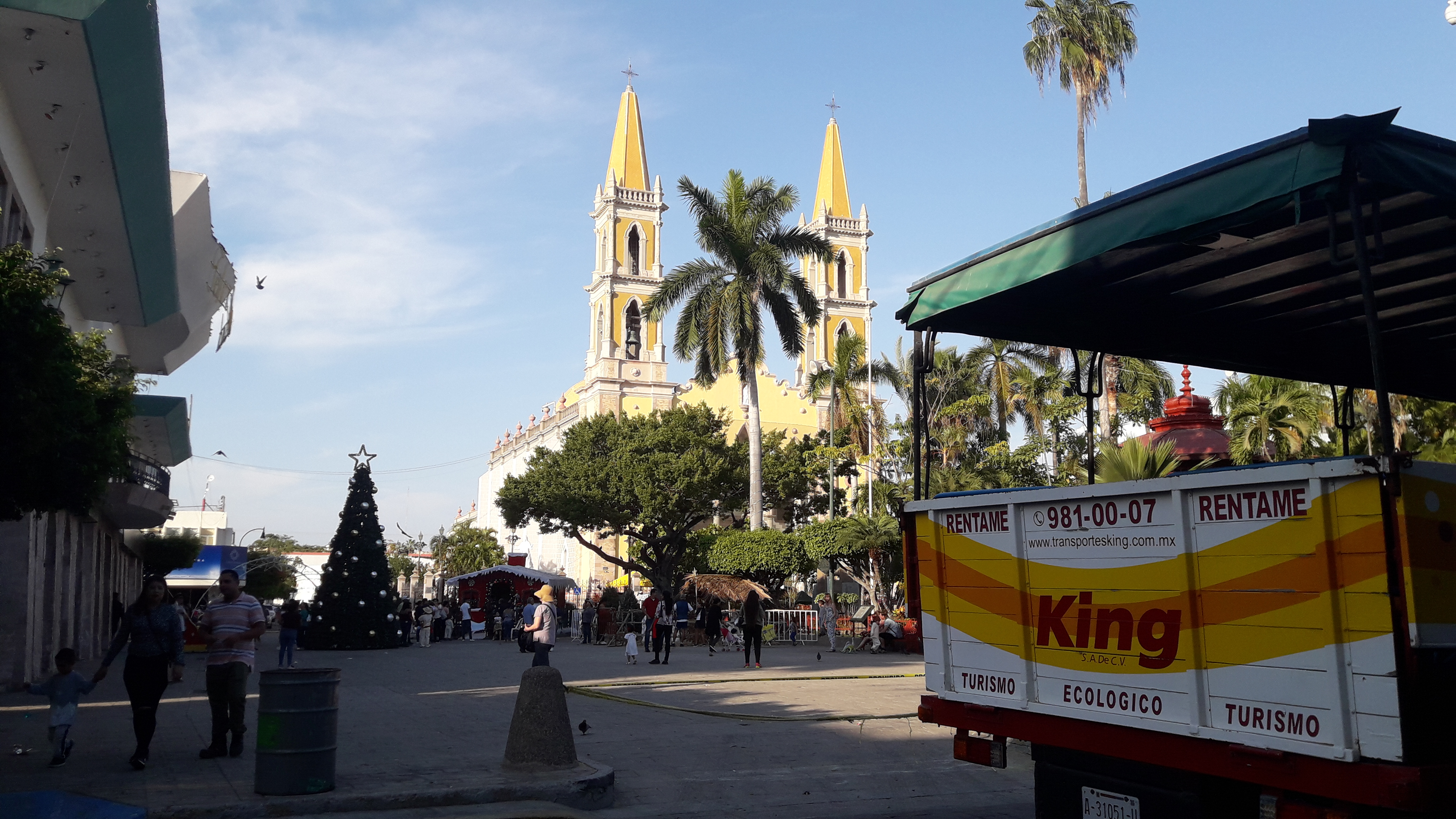
Square in front of the cathedral

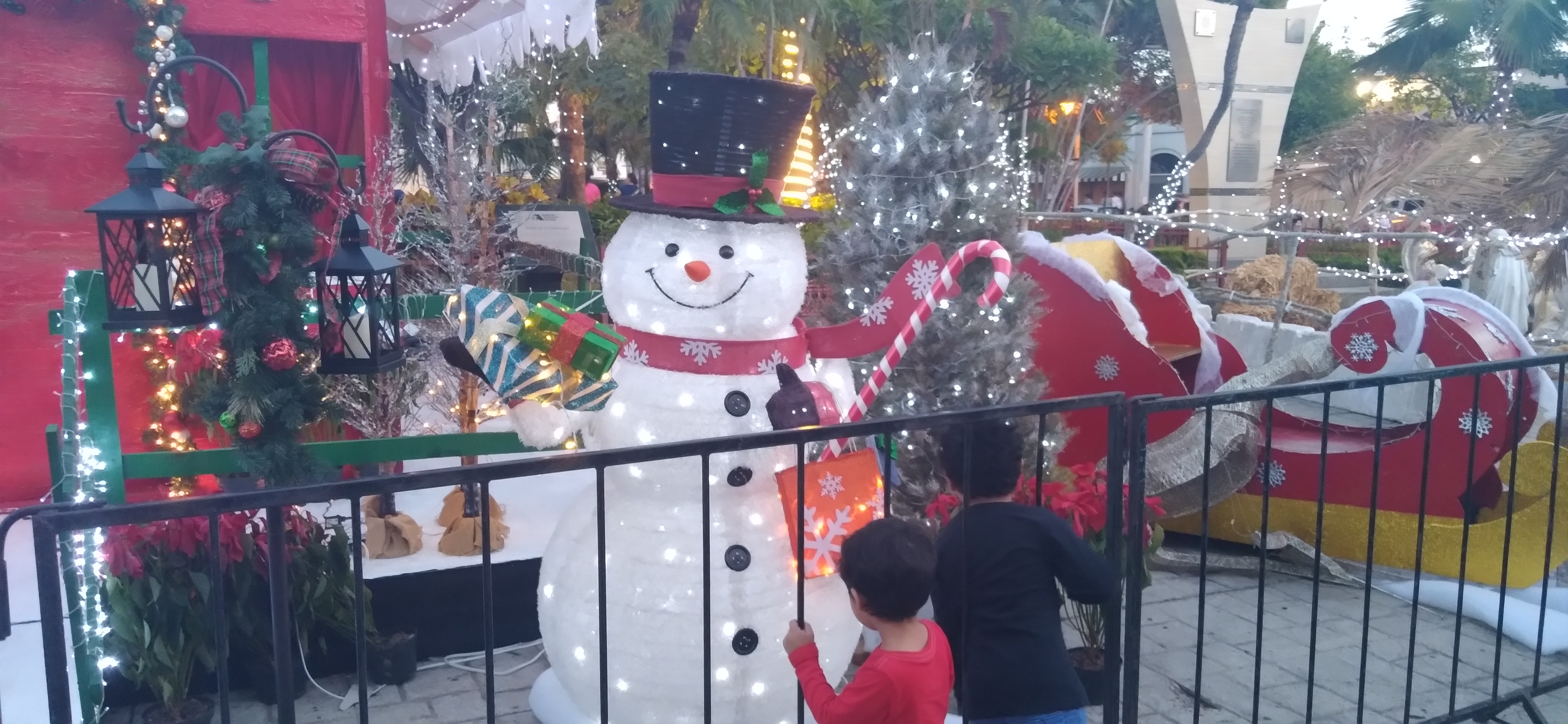
Christmas decorations in the Plazuela República

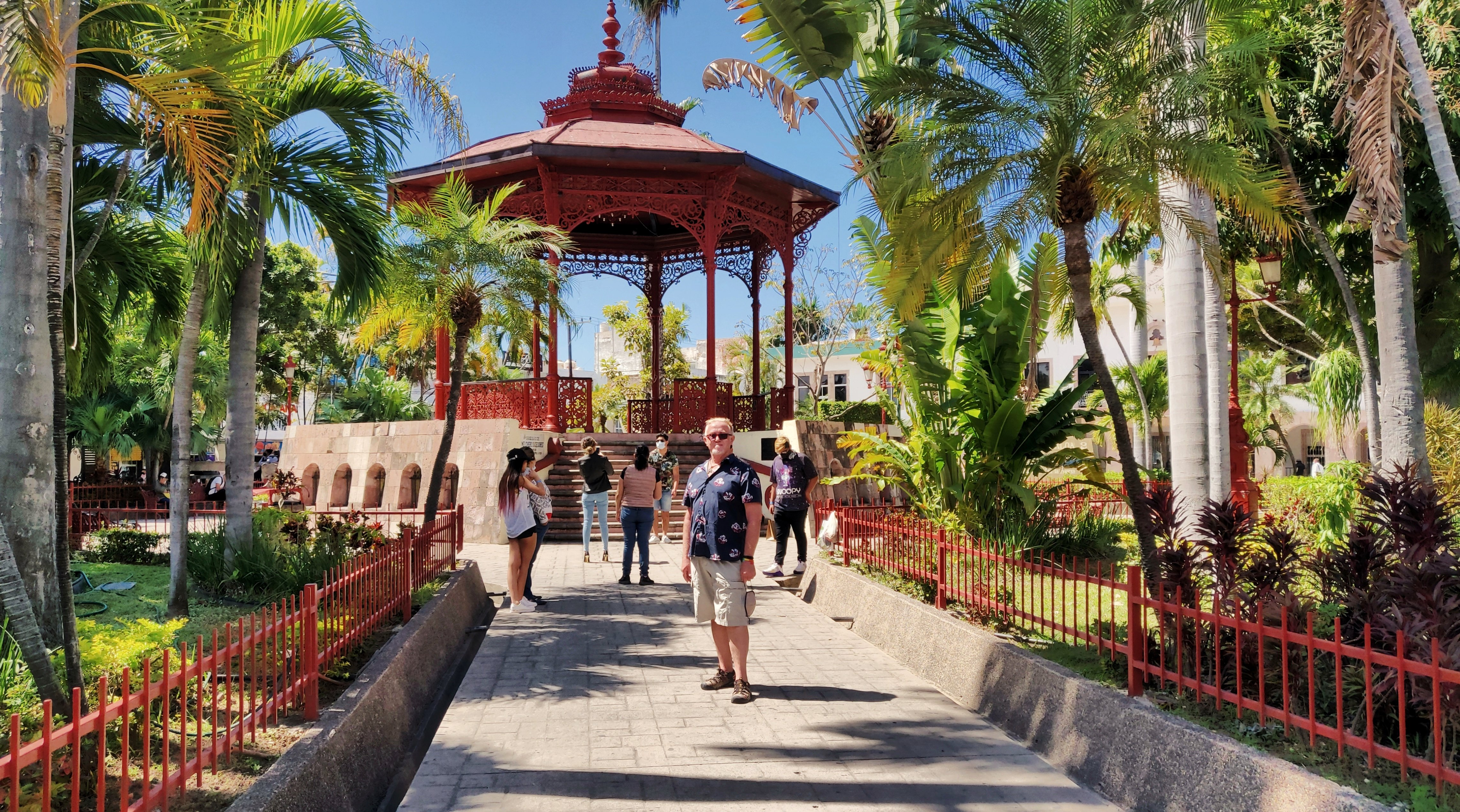
Plazuela República in 2021

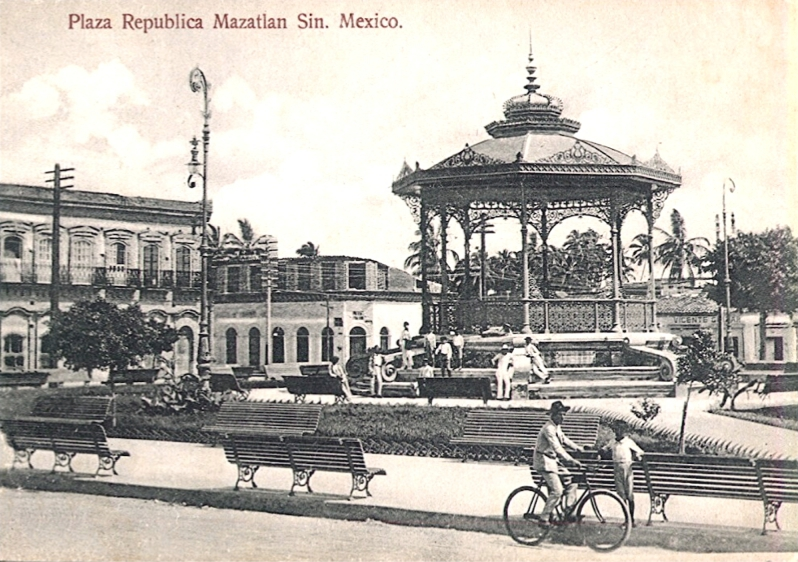
Plazuela República in the 20th century

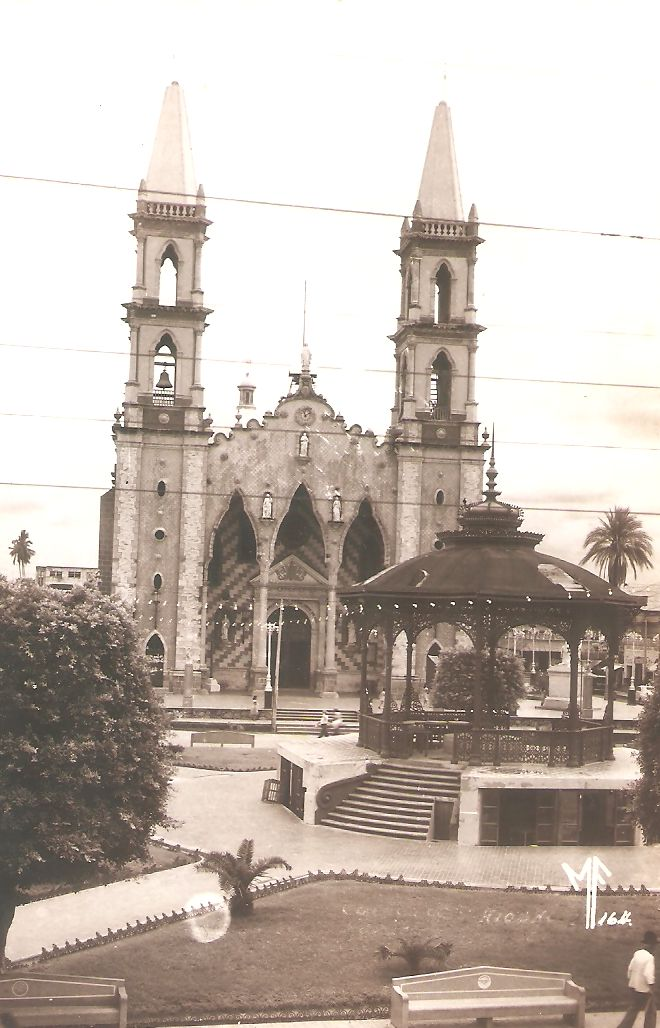
Plazuela and the cathedral

== See also ==
Media related to Plazuela República, Mazatlán at Wikimedia Commons
