= Palacio Municipal de Mazatlán =

Government building in Mazatlán

Municipal Palace of Mazatlán
- Palacio Municipal de Mazatlán
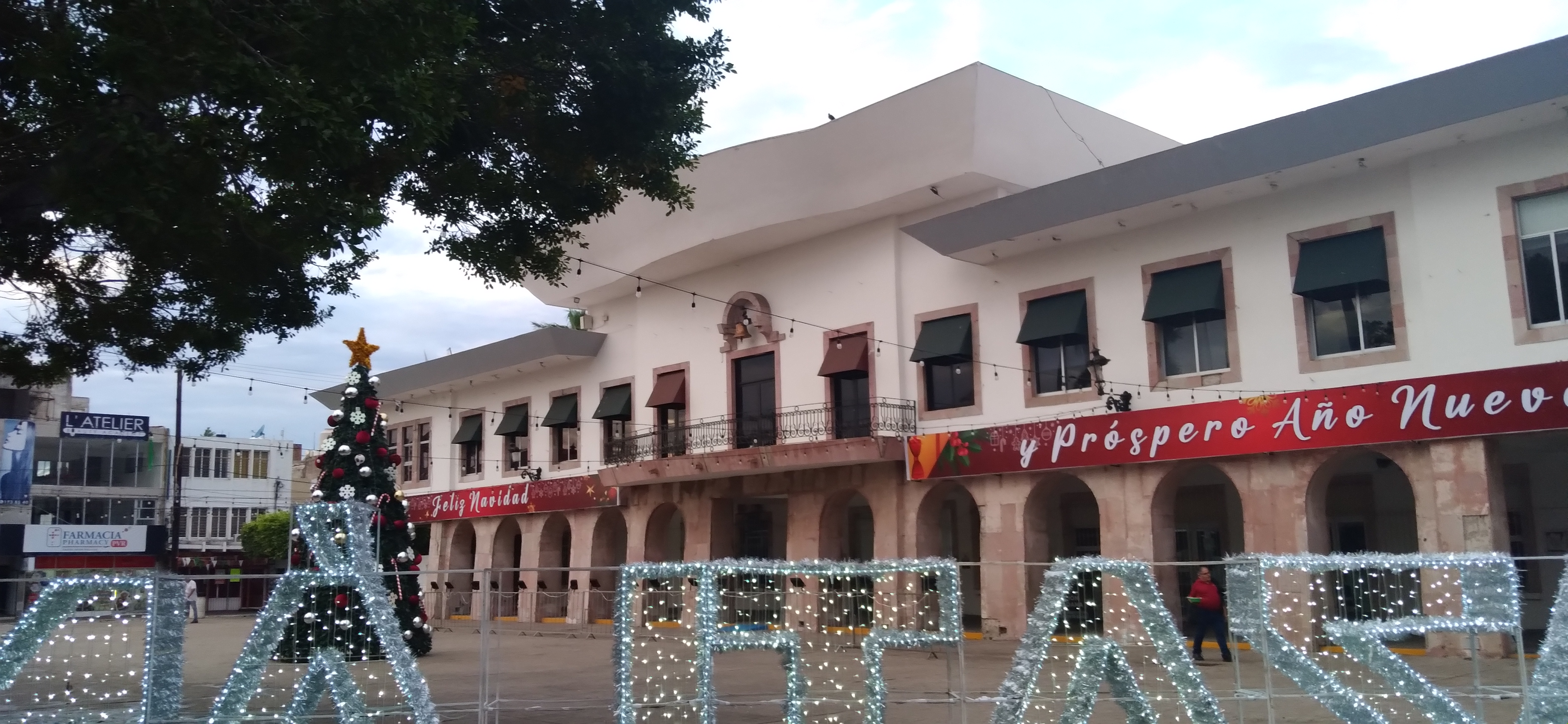
- The palace in its modern form
- Interactive map of the Municipal Palace of Mazatlán area

General information
- Location: Mazatlán, Mexico, Calle Ángel Flores corner with Calle 5 de Mayo, Colonia Centro, Mazatlán
- Coordinates: 23.200214°N 106.422306°W
- Year built: 1853-1856
- Construction started: 1853
- Completed: 1856
- Renovated: 1943
- Owner: Mazatlán Municipality

Technical details
- Material: Quarry
- Floor count: 2

Design and construction
- Engineer: Joaquín Sánchez Hidalgo (1943 renovation)

Website
- wvw.mazatlan.gob.mx

The Palacio Municipal de Mazatlán is a government building, headquarters of the Heroic Mazatlán City Council, in charge of administering and providing public services to the residents of the Mazatlán Municipality. It is located adjacent to the Cathedral and the Plazuela República, in the historic center of Mazatlán.

The palace has two floors and has a central patio in the Andalusian style, in addition to having portals on its main facade. Its central balcony has a panoramic view of the Plazuela República. The building in its current form was built in 1943 by local engineer Joaquín Sánchez Hidalgo, replacing the original building built in 1853. Its construction was carried out in an area of lagoons and the complex consisted of 3 buildings, the first of these, the municipal house, was completed in 1856. Over the years new additions have been added, like placing quarry and a parking lot that replaced a basketball court. During the Christmas holidays each year it is usually decorated with various decorations, lights and nativity scenes.

== Gallery ==
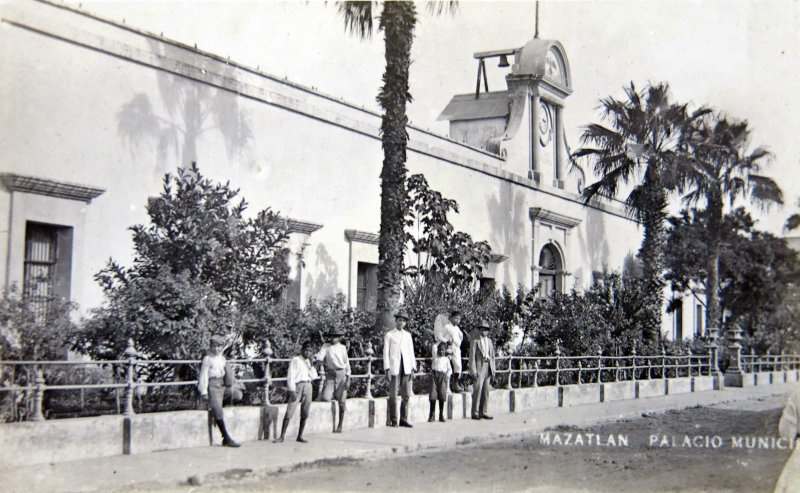
The palace in its original form

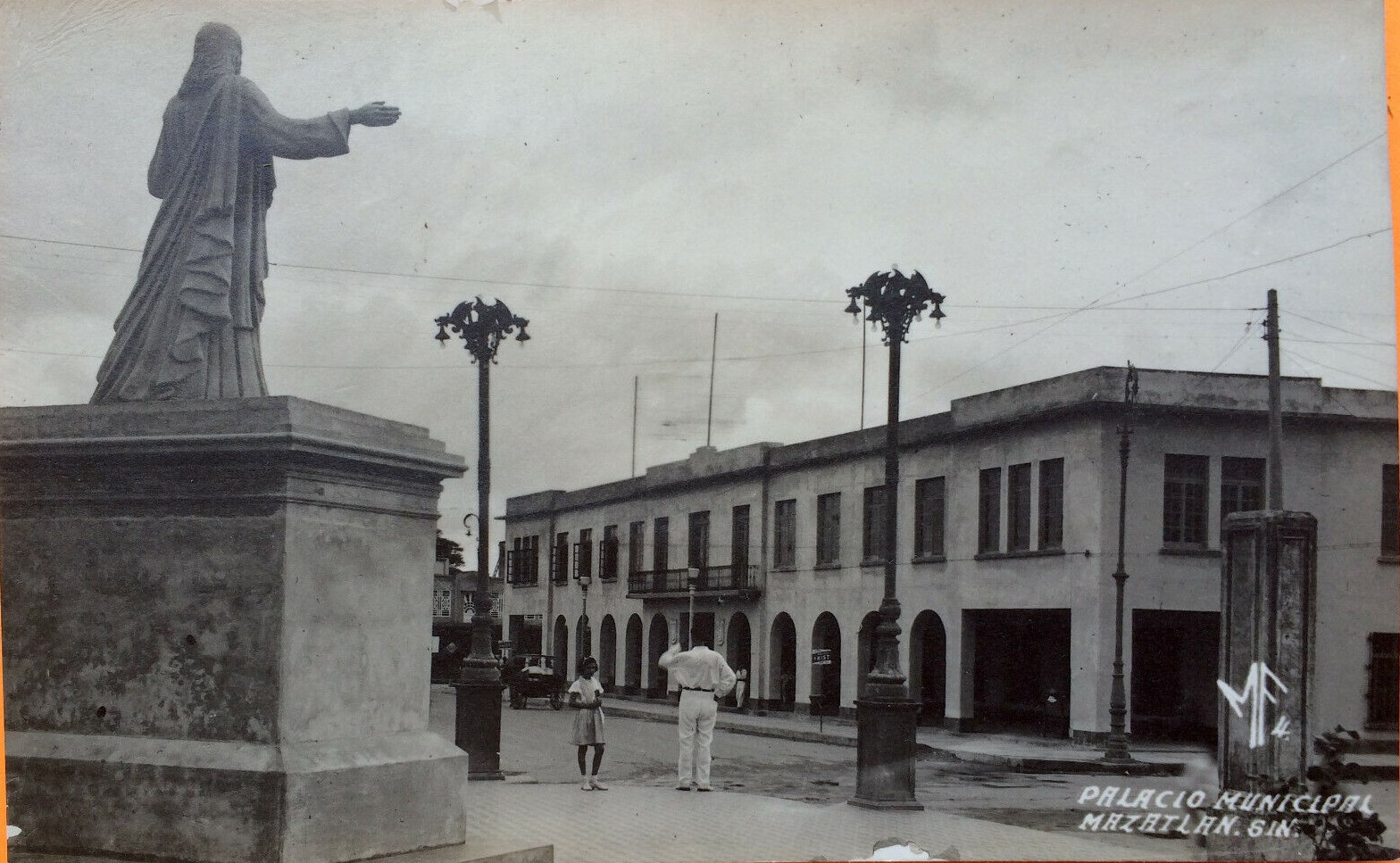
The palace after its renovation

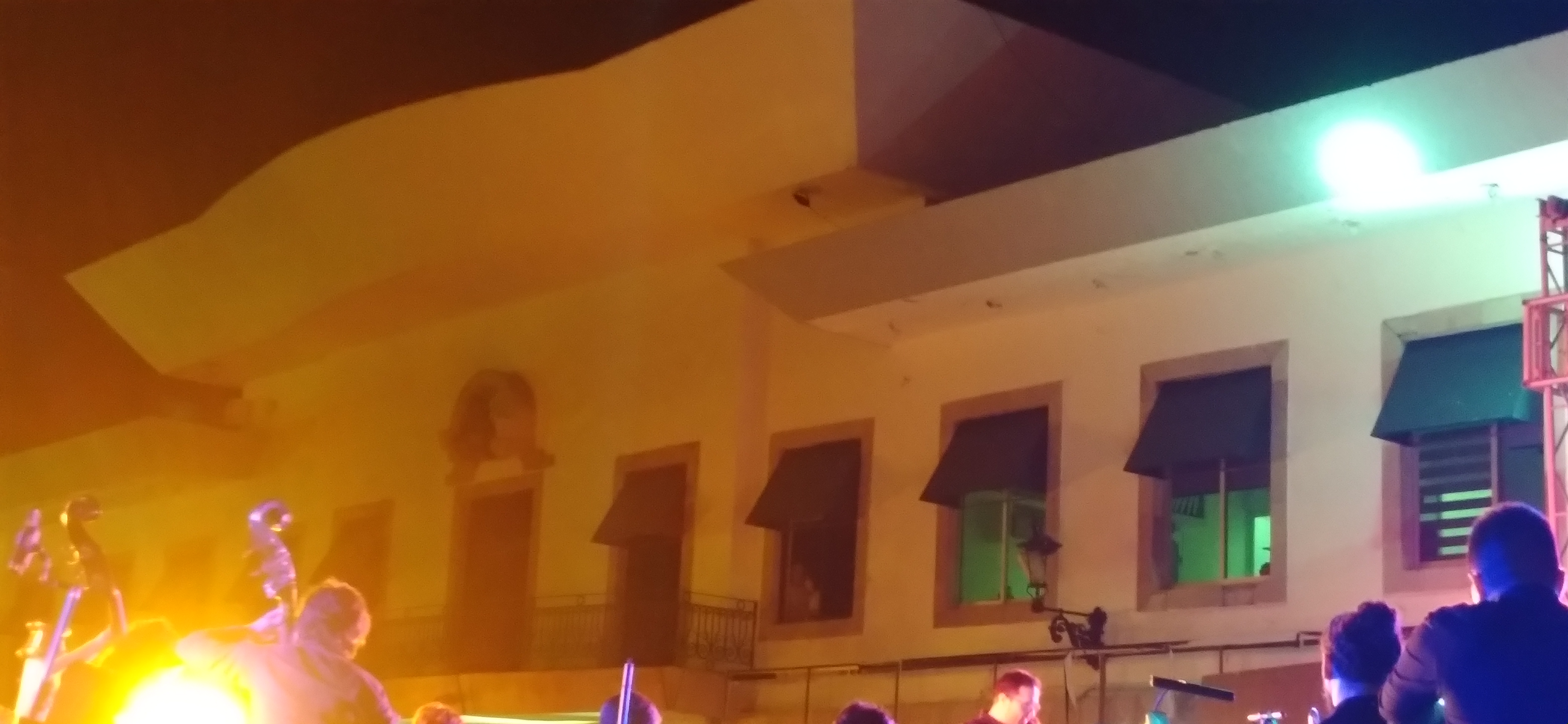
Second floor of the palace
