= Juan de Dios Caballero Reyes =

Mexican Roman Catholic bishop (born 1931)

His Excellency, The Most Reverend Juan de Dios Caballero Reyes
- Auxiliary Bishop Emeritus of Durango
- Church: Roman Catholic Church
- Archdiocese: Archdiocese of Durango
- Appointed: 18 November 1993
- Term ended: 21 July 2008
- Previous post: Bishop of Huejutla (1978–1993)

Orders
- Ordination: 31 October 1954
- Consecration: 21 September 1978 by Antonio López Aviña

Personal details
- Born: 23 June 1931 (age 94) Canatlán, Durango, Mexico
- Denomination: Roman Catholic

Juan de Dios Caballero Reyes (born 23 June 1931) is a Mexican Roman Catholic prelate, who served as bishop of the Diocese of Huejutla from 1978 to 1993 and later as auxiliary bishop of the Archdiocese of Durango from 1993 until his retirement in 2008.

== Early life and priesthood ==
Caballero Reyes was born on 23 June 1931 in Canatlán, in the state of Durango, Mexico. He studied at the diocesan seminary of Durango and was ordained a priest for the Archdiocese of Durango on 31 October 1954 in the Cathedral Basilica of Durango.

During his priestly ministry he served in several roles at the seminary, including prefect of discipline, professor of canon law and Sacred Scripture, spiritual director, vice-rector and rector. He also served as parish priest of Nuestra Señora de Lourdes in Durango and briefly as chancellor of the diocesan curia.

== Episcopal ministry ==
On 11 July 1978 Pope Paul VI appointed Caballero Reyes as bishop of the Diocese of Huejutla, in the state of Hidalgo.

He received episcopal consecration on 21 September 1978 from Archbishop Antonio López Aviña, with bishops Miguel García Franco and Pedro Aranda Díaz-Muñoz serving as co-consecrators.

During his episcopacy he promoted pastoral initiatives in the diocese, strengthened collaboration among clergy, and founded the Escuela Preparatoria Manríquez y Zárate. In 1988 he also arranged for the transfer of the remains of the first bishop of Huejutla to the cathedral of the diocese.

On 18 November 1993 Pope John Paul II accepted his resignation from the Diocese of Huejutla and appointed him auxiliary bishop of the Archdiocese of Durango.

He served in this role until 21 July 2008, when Pope Benedict XVI accepted his resignation upon reaching the canonical retirement age. After his retirement he became auxiliary bishop emeritus of Durango.

== Later activity ==
As bishop emeritus, Caballero Reyes has continued to participate occasionally in pastoral events in the Archdiocese of Durango.
