= Bartolomé García de Escañuela =

Most Reverend Bartolomé García de Escañuela
- Bishop of Durango
- Church: Catholic Church
- Diocese: Diocese of Durango
- In office: 1676–1684
- Predecessor: Juan de Ortega Cano Montañez y Patiño
- Successor: Manuel de Herrera
- Previous post: Bishop of Puerto Rico (1670–1676)

Orders
- Consecration: by Galeazzo Marescotti

Personal details
- Born: August 8, 1627 Archidona, Spain
- Died: November 20, 1684 (age 54) Durango, Mexico

Bartolomé García de Escañuela, O.F.M. (August 8, 1627 – November 20, 1684) was a Roman Catholic prelate who served as Bishop of Durango (1676–1684) and Bishop of Puerto Rico (1670–1676).

== Biography ==
Bartolomé García de Escañuela was born in Archidona, Spain and ordained a priest in the Order of Friars Minor. On October 6, 1670, he was appointed by the King of Spain and confirmed by Pope Clement X as Bishop of Puerto Rico. He was consecrated bishop by Galeazzo Marescotti, Apostolic Nuncio to Spain. On November 16, 1676, he was appointed by the King of Spain and confirmed by Pope Innocent XI as Bishop of Durango. He served as Bishop of Durango until his death on November 20, 1684.

== External links and additional sources ==
- Cheney, David M. "Archdiocese of San Juan de Puerto Rico". Catholic-Hierarchy.org. (for Chronology of Bishops) ^{[self-published]}
- Chow, Gabriel. "Metropolitan Archdiocese of San Juan de Puerto Rico". GCatholic.org. (for Chronology of Bishops) ^{[self-published]}
- Cheney, David M. "Archdiocese of Durango". Catholic-Hierarchy.org. (for Chronology of Bishops) ^{[self-published]}
- Chow, Gabriel. "Archdiocese of Durango (Mexico)". GCatholic.org. (for Chronology of Bishops) ^{[self-published]}

Religious titles
Preceded by Benito de Rivas	Bishop of Puerto Rico; 1670–1676	Succeeded by Juan de Santiago y León Garabito
Preceded by Juan de Ortega Cano Montañez y Patiño	Bishop of Durango; 1676–1684	Succeeded by Manuel de Herrera
