= García Felipe de Legazpi y Velasco Altamirano y Albornoz =

Most Reverend García Felipe de Legazpi y Velasco Altamirano y Albornoz
- Bishop of Tlaxcala
- Church: Catholic Church
- Diocese: Diocese of Tlaxcala
- In office: 1704–1706
- Predecessor: Ignacio de Urbina
- Successor: Pedro Nogales Dávila
- Previous posts: Bishop of Michoacán (1701–1704); Bishop of Durango (1691–1701)

Orders
- Consecration: December 7, 1692 by Francisco de Aguiar y Seijas y Ulloa

Personal details
- Born: February 15, 1643 New Spain (now Mexico)
- Died: March 6, 1706 (age 63) Puebla, New Spain

García Felipe de Legazpi y Velasco Altamirano y Albornoz (February 15, 1643 – March 6, 1706) was a Roman Catholic prelate who served as the Bishop of Tlaxcala (1704–1706), Bishop of Michoacán (1701–1704), and Bishop of Durango (1691–1701).

== Biography ==
García Felipe de Legazpi y Velasco Altamirano y Albornoz was born in modern-day Mexico. On June 19, 1691, he was selected by the King of Spain and confirmed by Pope Alexander VIII as Bishop of Durango. On December 7, 1692, he was consecrated bishop by Francisco de Aguiar y Seijas y Ulloa, Archbishop of México. On August 8, 1701, he was selected by the King of Spain and confirmed by Pope Pope Clement XI as Bishop of Michoacán; he was installed on March 4, 1703. On January 14, he was selected by the King of Spain and confirmed by Pope Clement XI as Bishop of Tlaxcala; he was installed on May 30, 1704. He served as Bishop of Tlaxcala until his death on March 6, 1706.

While bishop, he was the principal consecrator of Diego de Gorospe e Irala, Bishop of Nueva Segovia (1702), and Manuel de Escalante Colombres y Mendoza, Bishop of Durango (1703).

== External links and additional sources ==
- Cheney, David M. "Archdiocese of Durango". Catholic-Hierarchy.org. (for Chronology of Bishops) ^{[self-published]}
- Chow, Gabriel. "Archdiocese of Durango (Mexico)". GCatholic.org. (for Chronology of Bishops) ^{[self-published]}
- Cheney, David M. "Archdiocese of Puebla de los Ángeles, Puebla". Catholic-Hierarchy.org. (for Chronology of Bishops) ^{[self-published]}
- Chow, Gabriel. "Metropolitan Archdiocese of Puebla de los Ángeles (Mexico)". GCatholic.org. (for Chronology of Bishops) ^{[self-published]}
- Cheney, David M. "Archdiocese of Morelia". Catholic-Hierarchy.org. (for Chronology of Bishops) ^{[self-published]}
- Chow, Gabriel. "Metropolitan Archdiocese of Morelia (Mexico)". GCatholic.org. (for Chronology of Bishops) ^{[self-published]}

Catholic Church titles
Preceded by Manuel de Herrera	Bishop of Durango; 1691–1701	Succeeded by Manuel de Escalante Colombres y Mendoza
Preceded by Juan de Ortega Cano Montañez y Patiño	Bishop of Michoacán; 1701–1704	Succeeded by Manuel de Escalante Colombres y Mendoza
Preceded by Ignacio de Urbina	Bishop of Tlaxcala; 1704–1706	Succeeded by Pedro Nogales Dávila
