= Archdiocese of Durango =

Roman Catholic archdiocese in Mexico

Coordinates: 24.0228°N 104.6540°W

Archdiocese of Durango Archidioecesis Durangensis Arquidiócesis de Durango
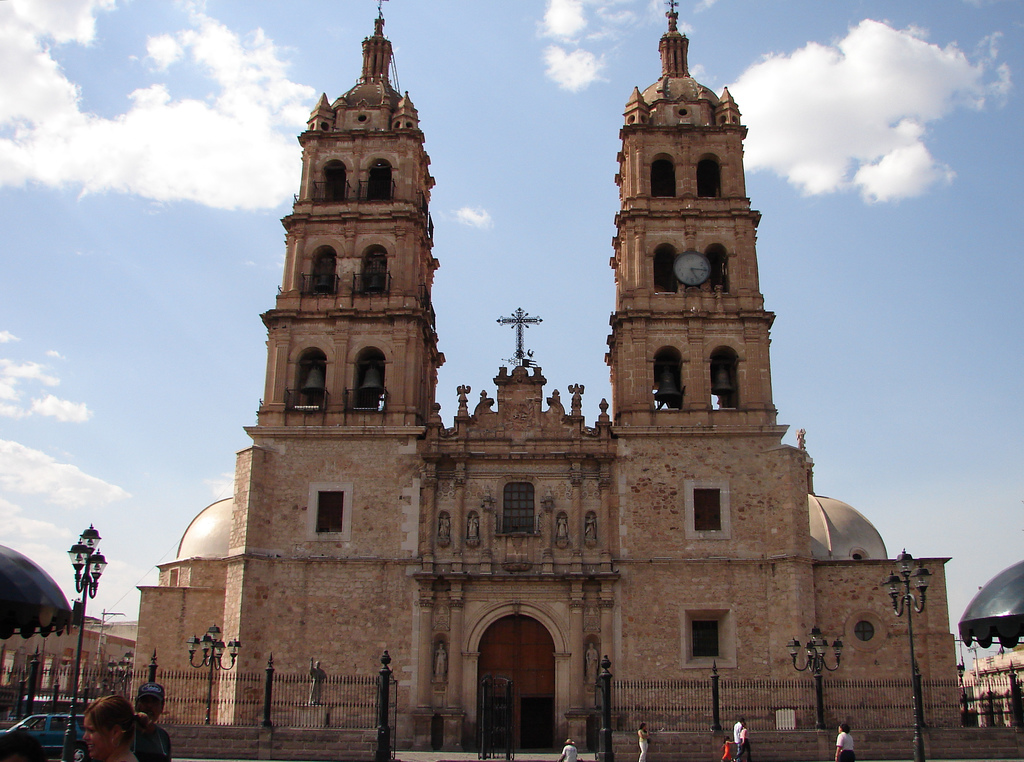
- Catedral Basílica de Nuestra Señora

Location
- Country: Mexico
- Ecclesiastical province: Province of Durango
- Metropolitan: Durango, Durango

Statistics
- Area: 42,264 sq mi (109,460 km^{2})
- Population: Total; Catholics: (as of 2006); 1,785,000; 1,642,200 (92%)
- Parishes: 105

Information
- Denomination: Roman Catholic
- Rite: Roman Rite
- Established: 28 September 1620 (405 years ago)
- Cathedral: Cathedral Basilica of Our Lady

Current leadership
- Pope: Leo XIV
- Archbishop: Faustino Armendáriz Jiménez
- Bishops emeritus: Héctor González Martinez; Juan de Dios Caballero Reyes

Map

Website
- arquidiocesisdurango.org/

The Roman Catholic Archdiocese of Durango (Latin: Archidioecesis Durangensis) is a Metropolitan Archdiocese in Mexico. Based in the city of Durango, it is the metropolitan see for the suffragan dioceses of Gómez Palacio, Mazatlán and Torreón as well as the Territorial Prelature of El Salto.

== Early history ==
The diocese had been erected in 1620 as the diocese for the entire northern area of New Spain and is considered a mother diocese-Sonora, Archdiocese of Santa Fe and Chihuahua were formed from Durango as population expanded in the 18th and 19th Centuries. It became a metropolitan archdiocese in 1891.

== Bishops ==
=== Ordinaries ===
Diocese of Durango

Erected: 28 September 1620

- Gonzalo Hernandez y Hermosillo y Gonzalez, O.S.A. (12 Oct 1620 – 28 Jan 1631 Died)
- Alfonso de Franco y Luna (7 Jun 1632 – 30 May 1639 Appointed, Bishop of La Paz)
- Francisco Diego Díaz de Quintanilla y de Hevía y Valdés, O.S.B. (8 Aug 1639 – 14 May 1655 Appointed, Bishop of Antequera, Oaxaca)
- Pedro de Barrientos Lomelin (31 May 1655 – 27 Dec 1658 Died)
- Juan Aguirre y Gorozpe (17 Nov 1659 – 21 Sep 1671 Died)
- Juan de Ortega Cano Montañez y Patiño (16 Apr 1674 – 9 Sep 1675 Appointed, Bishop of Santiago de Guatemala)
- Bartolomé Garcia de Escañuela, O.F.M. (16 Nov 1676 – 20 Nov 1684 Died)
- Manuel de Herrera, O.F.M. (13 May 1686 – 31 Jan 1689 Died)
- García Felipe de Legazpi y Velasco Altamirano y Albornoz (27 Aug 1691 – 8 Aug 1701 Appointed, Bishop of Michoacán)
- Manuel de Escalante Colombres y Mendoza (3 Oct 1701 – 19 May 1704 Appointed, Bishop of Michoacán)
- Ignacio Diez de la Barrera y Bastida (16 Nov 1705 – 20 Sep 1709 Died)
- Pedro de Tapiz y Garcia (26 Feb 1714 – 13 Apr 1722 Died)
- Benito Crespo y Monroy, O.S. (9 Oct 1722 – 20 Jan 1734 Confirmed, Bishop of Tlaxcala (Puebla de los Angeles))
- Martín de Elizacoechea (27 Jul 1735 – 8 Mar 1745 Confirmed, Bishop of Michoacán)
- Pedro Anselmo Sánchez de Tagle (10 Apr 1747 – 26 Sep 1757 Appointed, Bishop of Michoacán)
- Pedro Zamorana Romezal (19 Dec 1757 – 21 Dec 1768 Died)
- José Vicente Díaz Bravo, O. Carm. (20 Nov 1769 – 24 Apr 1772 Died)
- Antonio Macarulla Minguilla de Aguilain (14 Dec 1772 – 12 Jun 1781 Died)
- Esteban Lorenzo de Tristán y Esmenota (15 Dec 1783 – 17 Jun 1793 Appointed, Bishop of Guadalajara, Jalisco)
- José Joaquín Granados y Gálvez, O.F.M. (21 Feb 1794 – 19 Aug 1794 Died)
- Francisco Gabriel de Olivares y Benito (22 Feb 1795 – 26 Feb 1812 Died)
- Juan Francisco Castañiza Larrea y Gonzalez de Agüero (18 Dec 1815 – 29 Oct 1825 Died)
- José Antonio Laureano de Zubiría y Escalante (28 Feb 1831 – 28 Nov 1863 Died)
- José Vicente Salinas e Infanzón (22 Jun 1868 – 9 Jan 1894 Died)

Archdiocese of Durango

Elevated: 23 June 1891

- Santiago de Zubiría y Manzanera (18 Mar 1895 – 26 Jan 1909 Died)
- Francisco de Paula Mendoza y Herrera (7 Aug 1909 – 23 Jul 1923 Died)
- José María González y Valencia (24 Mar 1924 – 28 Jan 1959 Died)
- Lucio Torreblanca y Tapia (25 May 1959 – 23 Aug 1961 Died)
- Antonio López Aviña (14 Dec 1961 – 4 Mar 1993 Retired)
- José Trinidad Medel Pérez (4 Mar 1993 – 5 Jun 2002 Resigned)
- Héctor González Martínez (11 Feb 2003 – 26 Sep 2014 Retired)
- José Antonio Fernández Hurtado (26 Sep 2014 – 25 Jan 2019 Appointed, Archbishop of Tlalnepantla, México)
- Faustino Armendáriz Jiménez (21 Sep 2019 - )

=== Auxiliary bishops ===
- José María González y Valencia (1922–1924), appointed Archbishop here
- Francisco Ferreira Arreola (1957–1960), appointed Bishop of Texcoco, México
- Rafael Barraza Sánchez (1979–1981), appointed Bishop of Mazatlán, Sinaloa
- Manuel Mireles Vaquera (1982–1988), appointed Coadjutor Prelate of El Salto, Durango
- José Andrés Corral Arredondo (1989–1992), appointed Bishop of Parral, Chihuahua
- Juan de Dios Caballero Reyes (1993–2008)
- Enrique Sánchez Martínez (2008–2015), appointed Bishop of Nuevo Laredo, Tamaulipas

=== Other priests of this diocese who became bishops ===
- Nicolás Pérez Gavilán y Echeverría, appointed Bishop of Chihuahua in 1902
- Norberto Rivera Carrera, appointed Bishop of Tehuacán, Puebla in 1985; future Cardinal

== Present Bishops ==
- Archbishop: Faustino Armendáriz Jiménez
- Archbishop Emeritus: Héctor González Martínez
- Auxiliary Bishop Emeritus: Juan de Dios Caballero Reyes

== See also ==
- List of Roman Catholic archdioceses in México
