= Territorial Prelature of El Salto =

Roman Catholic ecclesiastical jurisdiction in Mexico

Territorial Prelature of El Salto Praelatura Territorialis Saltensis in Mexico Prelatura Territorial de El Salto

Location
- Country: Mexico
- Ecclesiastical province: Province of Durango
- Metropolitan: El Salto, Durango

Statistics
- Area: 13,905 sq mi (36,010 km^{2})
- Population: Total; Catholics: (as of 2004); 370,000; 314,000 (84.9%)
- Parishes: 15

Information
- Denomination: Roman Catholic
- Rite: Roman Rite
- Established: 10 June 1968 (57 years ago)
- Cathedral: Cathedral of Our Lady of Guadalupe

Current leadership
- Pope: Leo XIV
- Prelate: Juan María Huerta Muro, O.F.M.

Website
- arquidiocesisdurango.org/el-salto/

The Roman Catholic Territorial Prelature of El Salto (Latin: Praelatura Territorialis Saltensis in Mexico) (erected 10 June 1968) is a suffragan of the Archdiocese of Durango.

== Ordinaries ==
- Francisco Medina Ramírez, o.c.d. (1973–1988)
- Manuel Mireles Vaquera (1988–2005) - Prelate Emeritus
- Ruy Rendón Leal (2005–2011), appointed Bishop of Matamoros, Tamaulipas
- Juan María Huerta Muro, o.f.m. (since 2012)

== Episcopal See ==
- El Salto, Durango
