= Manuel de Herrera =

Most Reverend Bartolomé García de Escañuela
- Bishop of Durango
- Church: Catholic Church
- Diocese: Diocese of Durango
- In office: 1686–1689
- Predecessor: Bartolomé Garcia de Escañuela
- Successor: García Felipe de Legazpi y Velasco Altamirano y Albornoz

Personal details
- Born: 1635 Salamanca, Spain
- Died: January 31, 1689 (age 54) Durango, Mexico

Manuel de Herrera (1635 – January 31, 1689) was a Roman Catholic prelate who served as Bishop of Durango (1686–1689).

== Biography ==
Manuel de Herrera was born in Salamanca, Spain and ordained a priest in the Order of Friars Minor. On March 14, 1686, he was selected by the King of Spain and confirmed on May 13, 1686, by Pope Innocent XI as Bishop of Durango. He served as Bishop of Durango until his death on January 31, 1689.

== External links and additional sources ==
- Cheney, David M. "Archdiocese of Durango". Catholic-Hierarchy.org. (for Chronology of Bishops) ^{[self-published]}
- Chow, Gabriel. "Archdiocese of Durango (Mexico)". GCatholic.org. (for Chronology of Bishops) ^{[self-published]}

Religious titles
Preceded by Bartolomé Garcia de Escañuela	Bishop of Durango; 1686–1689	Succeeded by García Felipe de Legazpi y Velasco Altamirano y Albornoz
