= Manuel de Escalante Colombres y Mendoza =

Peruvian Catholic priest (1649–1708)

Most Reverend Manuel de Escalante Colombres y Mendoza
- Bishop of Michoacán
- Church: Catholic Church
- Diocese: Diocese of Michoacán
- In office: 1704–1708
- Predecessor: García Felipe de Legazpi y Velasco Altamirano y Albornoz
- Successor: Felipe Ignacio Trujillo y Guerrero
- Previous post: Bishop of Durango (1701–1704)

Orders
- Consecration: 19 May 1704 by García Felipe de Legazpi y Velasco Altamirano y Albornoz

Personal details
- Born: 1649 Lima, Peru
- Died: 15 May 1708 (age 59) Michoacán, Mexico

Manuel de Escalante Colombres y Mendoza (1649–1708) was a Roman Catholic prelate who served as Bishop of Michoacán (1704–1708) and Bishop of Durango (1701–1704).

== Biography ==
Manuel de Escalante Colombres y Mendoza was born in Lima, Peru, although some sources say Lerma, in 1649 son of Manuel de Escalante Colombres y Mendoza and Ana María de Laínez de Morales who were married in Lima in 1639. His brother Pedro de Escalante Mendoza y Laínez was the count of Loja On 3 October 1701, he was appointed during the papacy of Pope Clement XI as Bishop of Durango. On October 28, 1618, he was consecrated bishop by García Felipe de Legazpi y Velasco Altamirano y Albornoz, Bishop of Michoacán. On September 17, 1629, he was appointed during the papacy of Pope Clement XI as Bishop of Michoacán; and installed on 27 June 1704. He served as Bishop of Michoacán until his death on 15 May 1708.

== External links and additional sources ==
- Cheney, David M. "Archdiocese of Durango". Catholic-Hierarchy.org. (for Chronology of Bishops) ^{[self-published]}
- Chow, Gabriel. "Archdiocese of Durango (Mexico)". GCatholic.org. (for Chronology of Bishops) ^{[self-published]}
- Cheney, David M. "Archdiocese of Morelia". Catholic-Hierarchy.org. (for Chronology of Bishops) ^{[self-published]}
- Chow, Gabriel. "Metropolitan Archdiocese of Morelia (Mexico)". GCatholic.org. (for Chronology of Bishops) ^{[self-published]}

Catholic Church titles
Preceded by García Felipe de Legazpi y Velasco Altamirano y Albornoz	Bishop of Durango; 1701–1704	Succeeded by Ignacio Diez de la Barrera y Bastida
Preceded by García Felipe de Legazpi y Velasco Altamirano y Albornoz	Bishop of Michoacán; 1704–1708	Succeeded by Felipe Ignacio Trujillo y Guerrero
