= Ignacio Diez de la Barrera y Bastida =

Most Reverend Ignacio Diez de la Barrera y Bastida
- Bishop of Durango
- Church: Catholic Church
- Diocese: Diocese of Durango
- In office: 1705–1709
- Predecessor: Manuel de Escalante Colombres y Mendoza
- Successor: Pedro de Tapiz y Garcia

Personal details
- Born: 1645 Mexico
- Died: 20 September 1709 (age 64) Durango, Mexico

Ignacio Diez de la Barrera y Bastida (1645–1709) was a Roman Catholic prelate who served as Bishop of Durango (1701–1704).

== Biography ==
Ignacio Diez de la Barrera y Bastida was born in Mexico in 1645. On 16 November 1705, he was appointed during the papacy of Pope Clement XI as Bishop of Durango. On 30 January 1707, he was consecrated bishop. He served as Bishop of Durango until his death on 20 September 1709.

== See also ==
- Catholic Church in Mexico

== External links and additional sources ==
- Cheney, David M. "Archdiocese of Durango". Catholic-Hierarchy.org. (for Chronology of Bishops) ^{[self-published]}
- Chow, Gabriel. "Archdiocese of Durango (Mexico)". GCatholic.org. (for Chronology of Bishops) ^{[self-published]}

Religious titles
Preceded by Manuel de Escalante Colombres y Mendoza	Bishop of Durango; 1705–1709	Succeeded by Pedro de Tapiz y Garcia
