= Basilica Cathedral of Mazatlán =

Cathedral Basilica of the Immaculate Conception
- Catedral Basílica de la Inmaculada Concepción
- Cathedral of Mazatlán
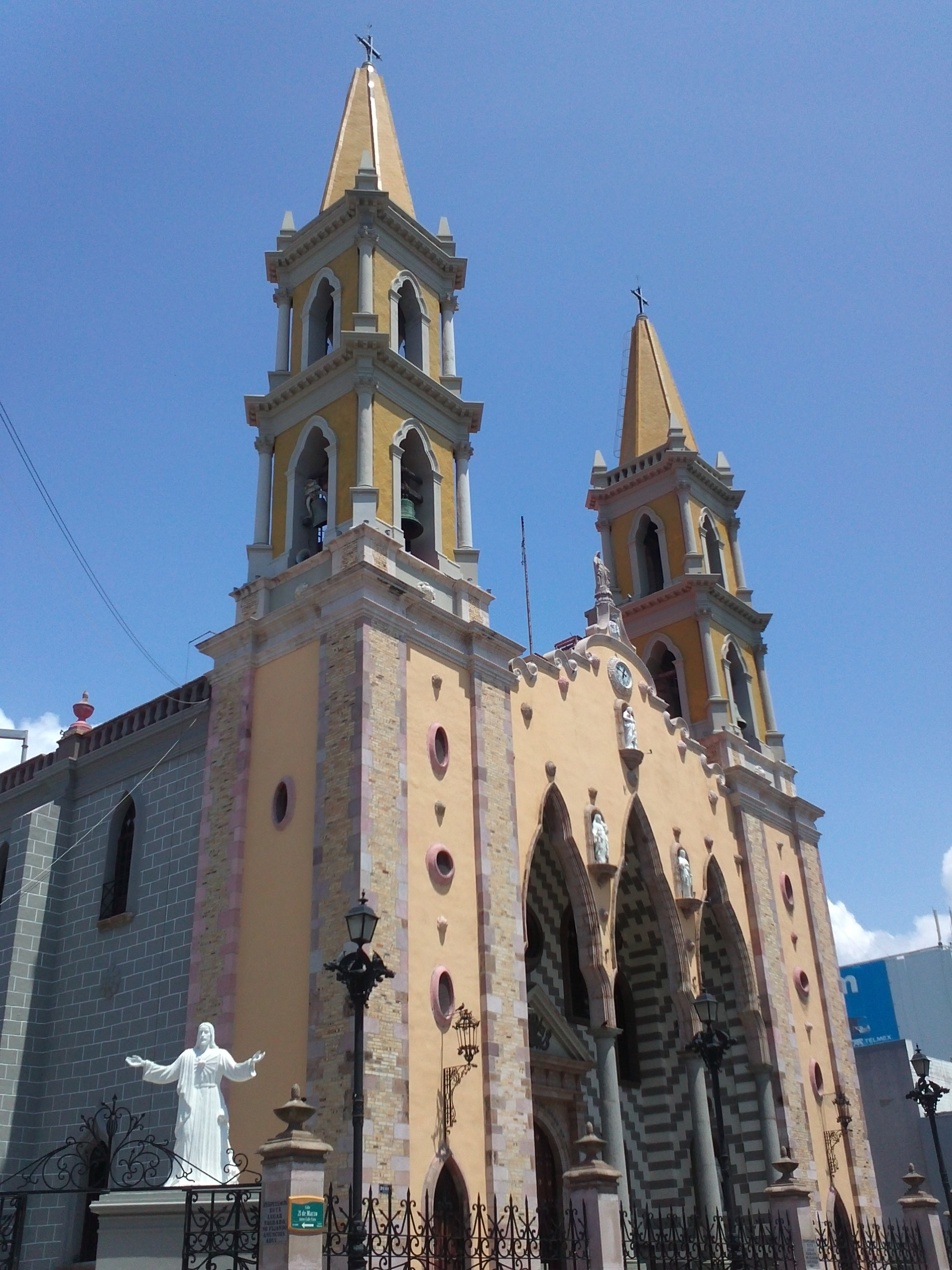
- Cathedral Basilica of the Immaculate Conception
- 23°12′3.5″N 106°25′18.5″W
- Location: Mazatlán
- Country: Mexico
- Denomination: Roman Catholic Church
- Sui iuris church: Latin Church
- Website: sinaloa.travel/directorio/catedral-basilica-de-la-inmaculada-concepcion

History
- Status: Cathedral; Minor basilica
- Founded: 1856
- Founder: Pedro Loza y Pardavé
- Dedication: Immaculate Conception
- Dedicated: 8 November 1938
- Consecrated: 12 December 1941

Architecture
- Functional status: Active
- Heritage designation: Centro Histórico de Mazatlán
- Designated: 2001
- Architect: Estanislao León
- Architectural type: Neobaroque
- Style: Baroque-Revival
- Years built: 1856-1899
- Groundbreaking: 1856
- Completed: 1899

Specifications
- Materials: Carrara marble

Administration
- Archdiocese: Roman Catholic Archdiocese of Durango
- Diocese: Roman Catholic Diocese of Mazatlán

Clergy
- Bishop: Mario Espinosa Contreras
- Rector: Adán Pasos Sánchez
- Vicar: Manuel Andrés Cárdenas Velarde

The Cathedral Basilica of the Immaculate Conception (Spanish: Catedral Basílica de la Inmaculada Concepción), also Mazatlán Cathedral, is the main religious building in the city of Mazatlán, in Baroque-Revival style of Sinaloa, Mexico, and home of the Roman Catholic Diocese of Mazatlán. It is located in the historical center.

Work on the temple began in 1856 by order of then Bishop Pedro Loza and Pardavé. Later, parish priest Miguel Lacarra took over the work and it was completed 1899. The temple-like basilica was consecrated 12 December 1941.

It consists of basilical plant, with three naves, which have the same height. It has an octagonal dome with lantern, crowned by an iron cross. The towers are of two bodies and present shots in the form of truncated prisms, which are crowned by a cross.

== Gallery ==
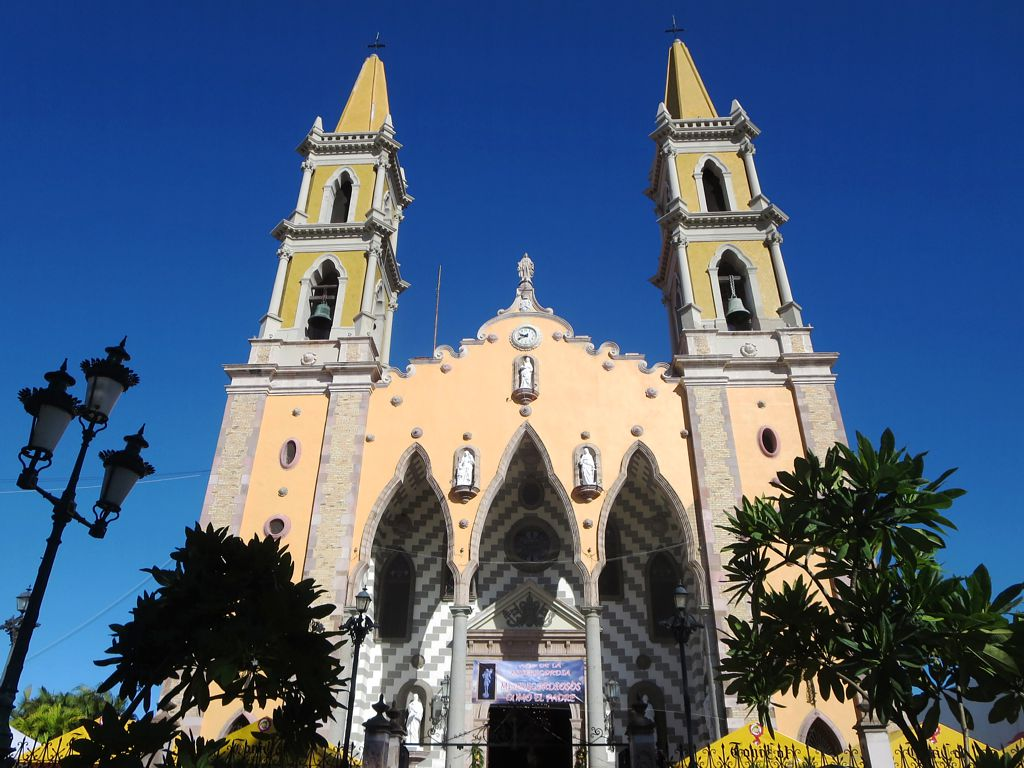
Facade of the cathedral

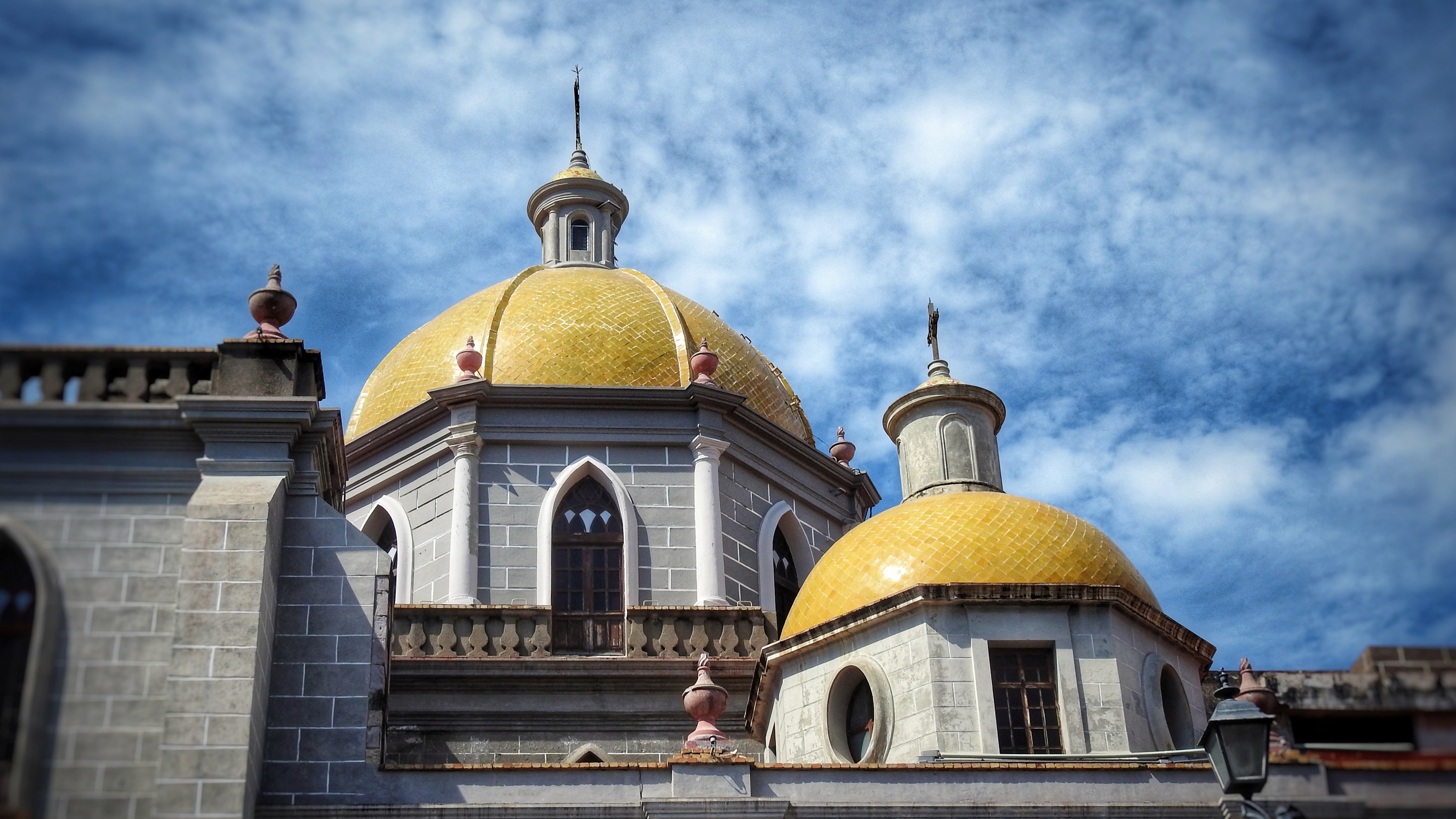
Domes

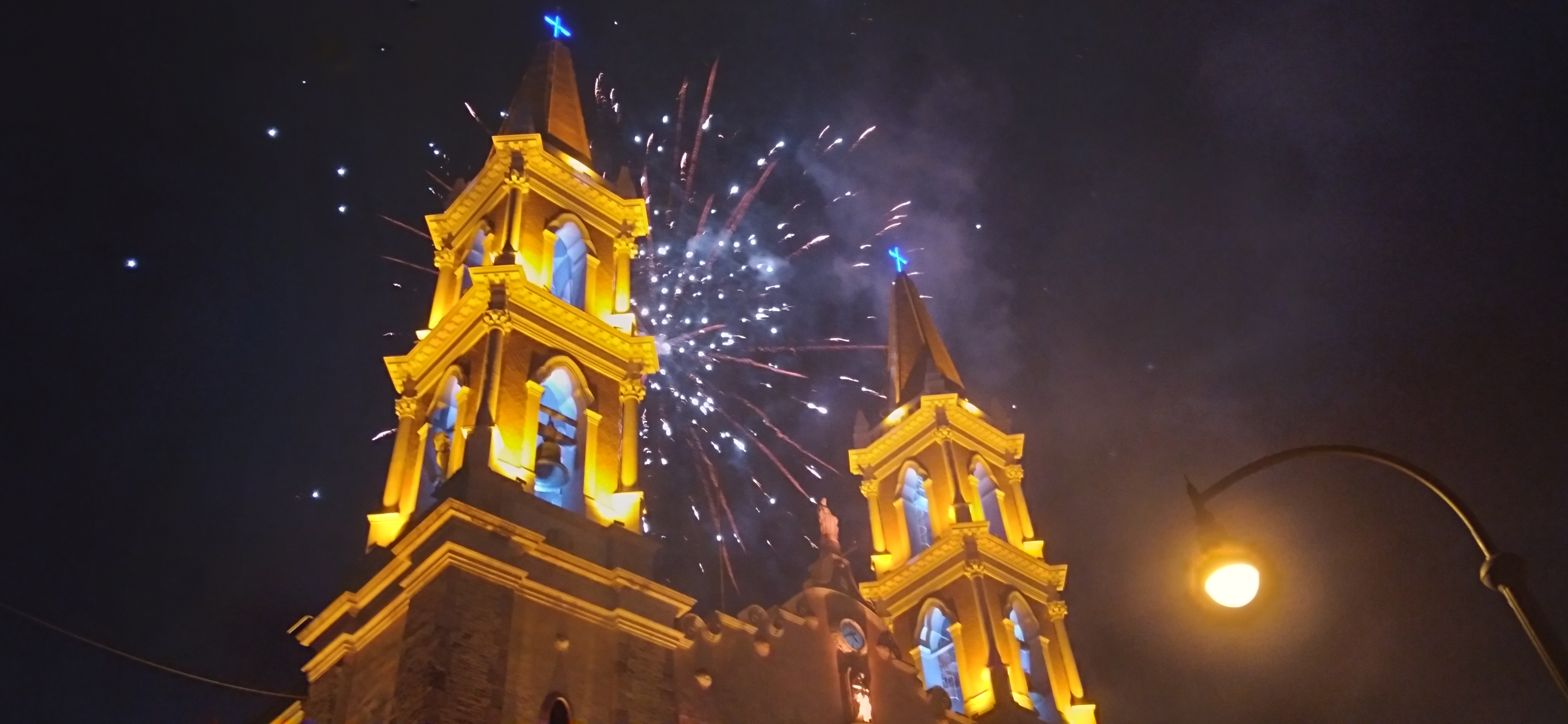
Cathedral lights

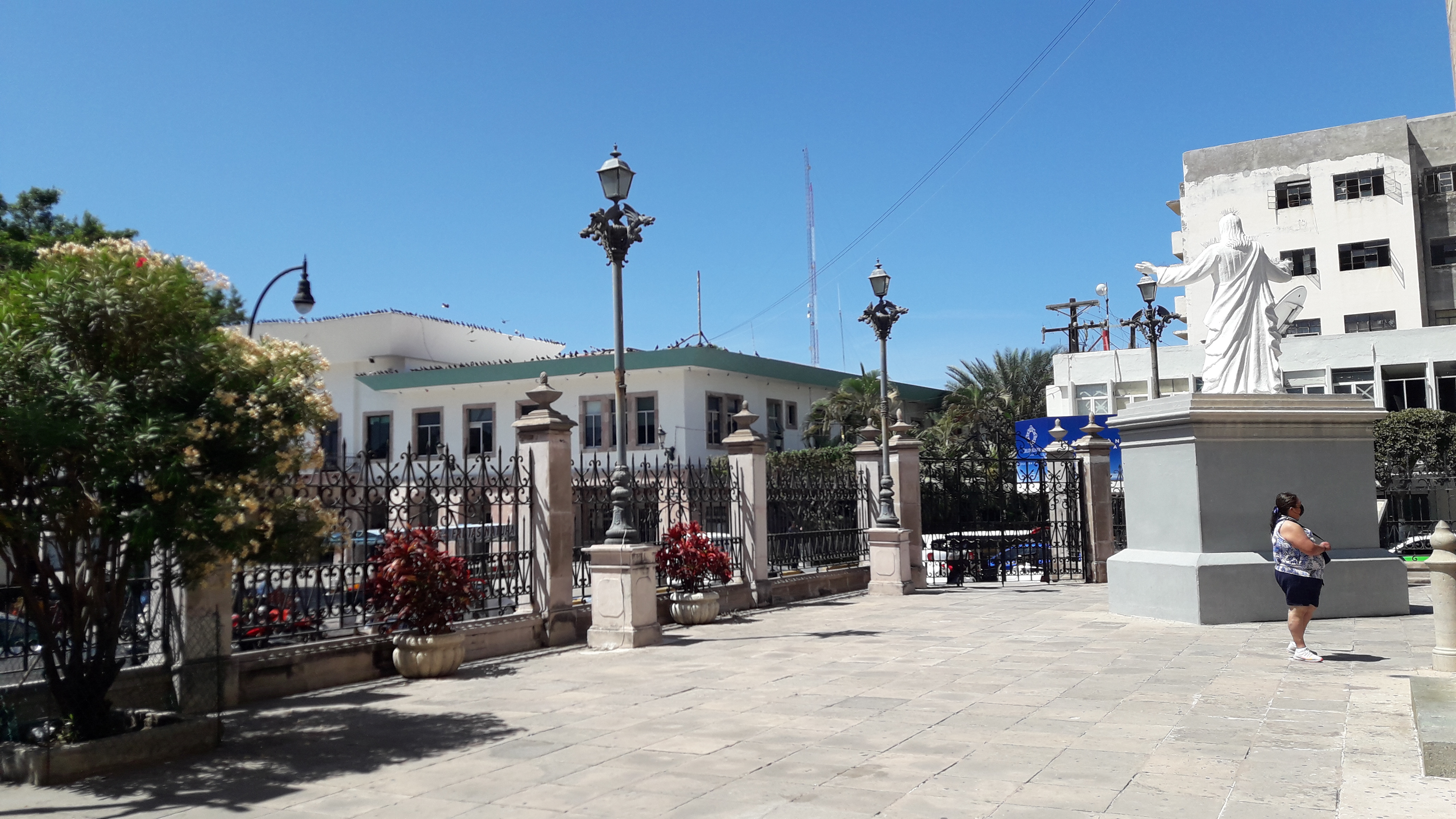
Atrium and statue of Jesus Christ

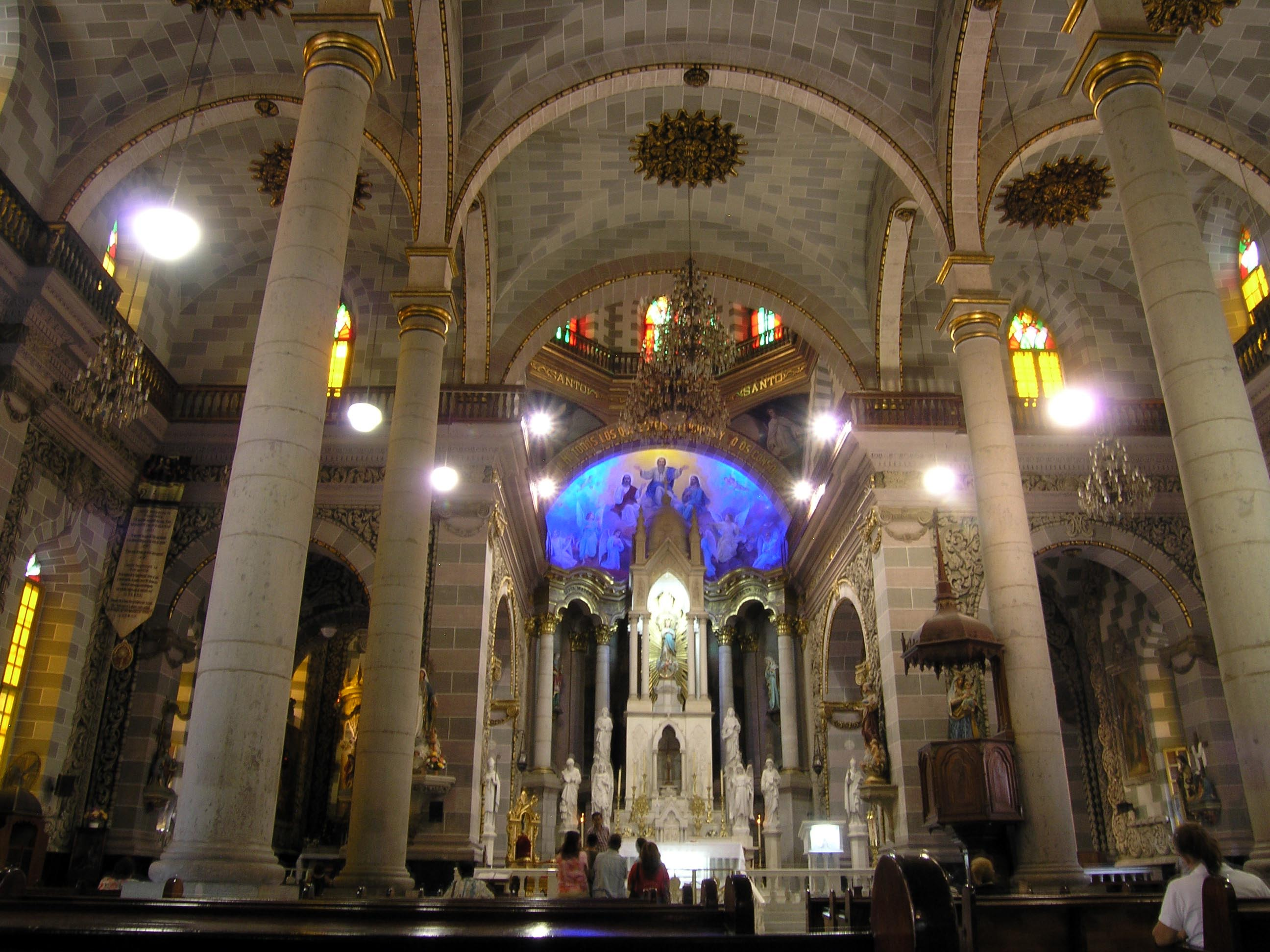
Interior of the cathedral

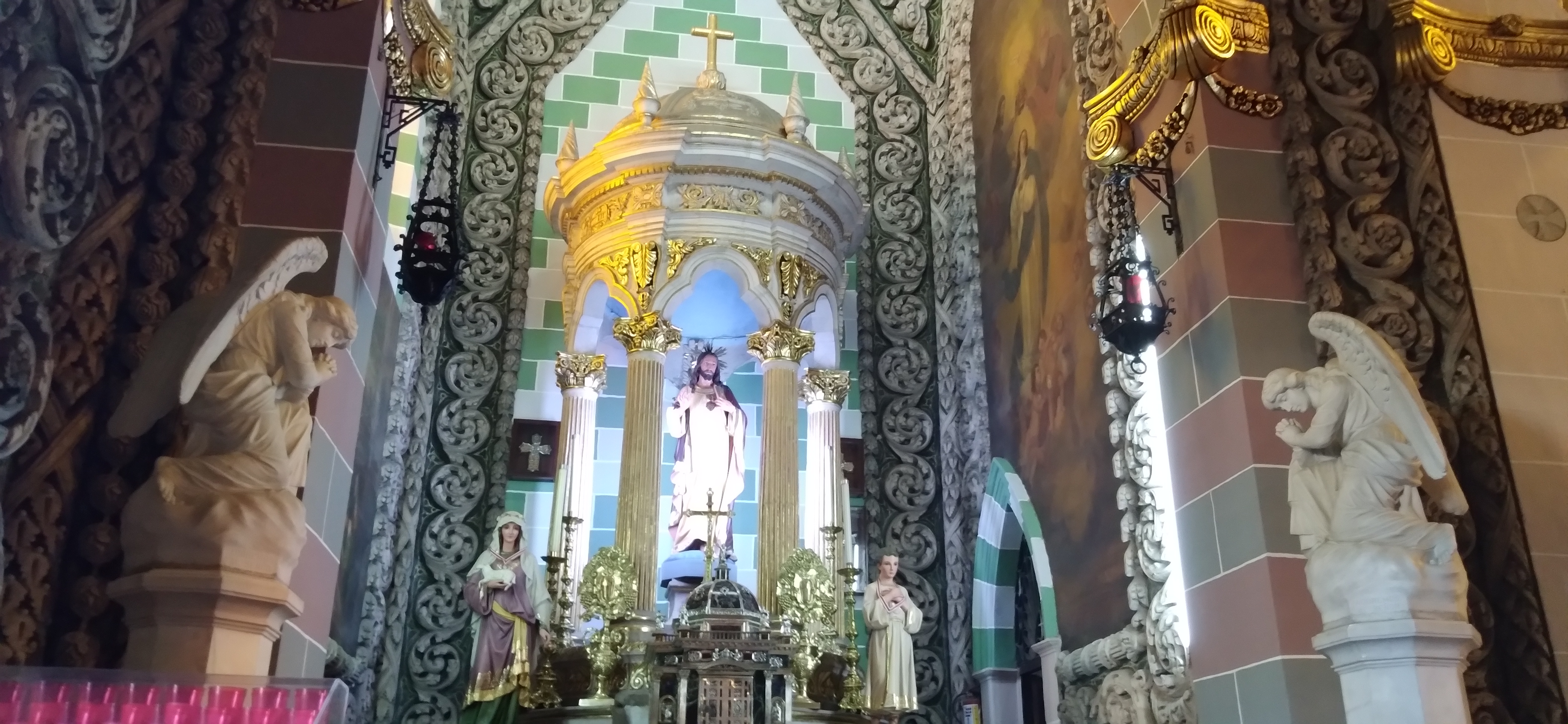
Holy Sacrament Chapel

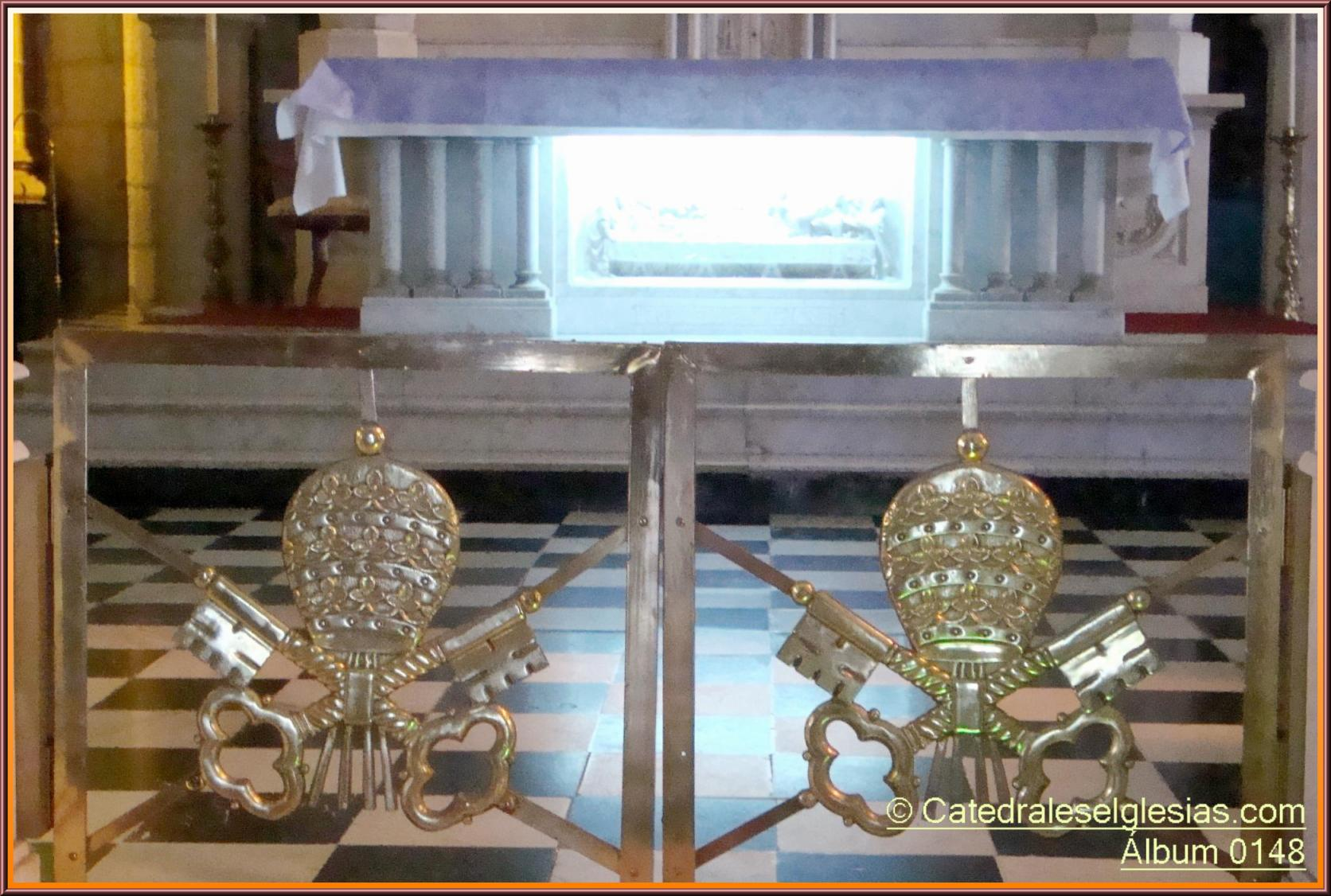
Main altar

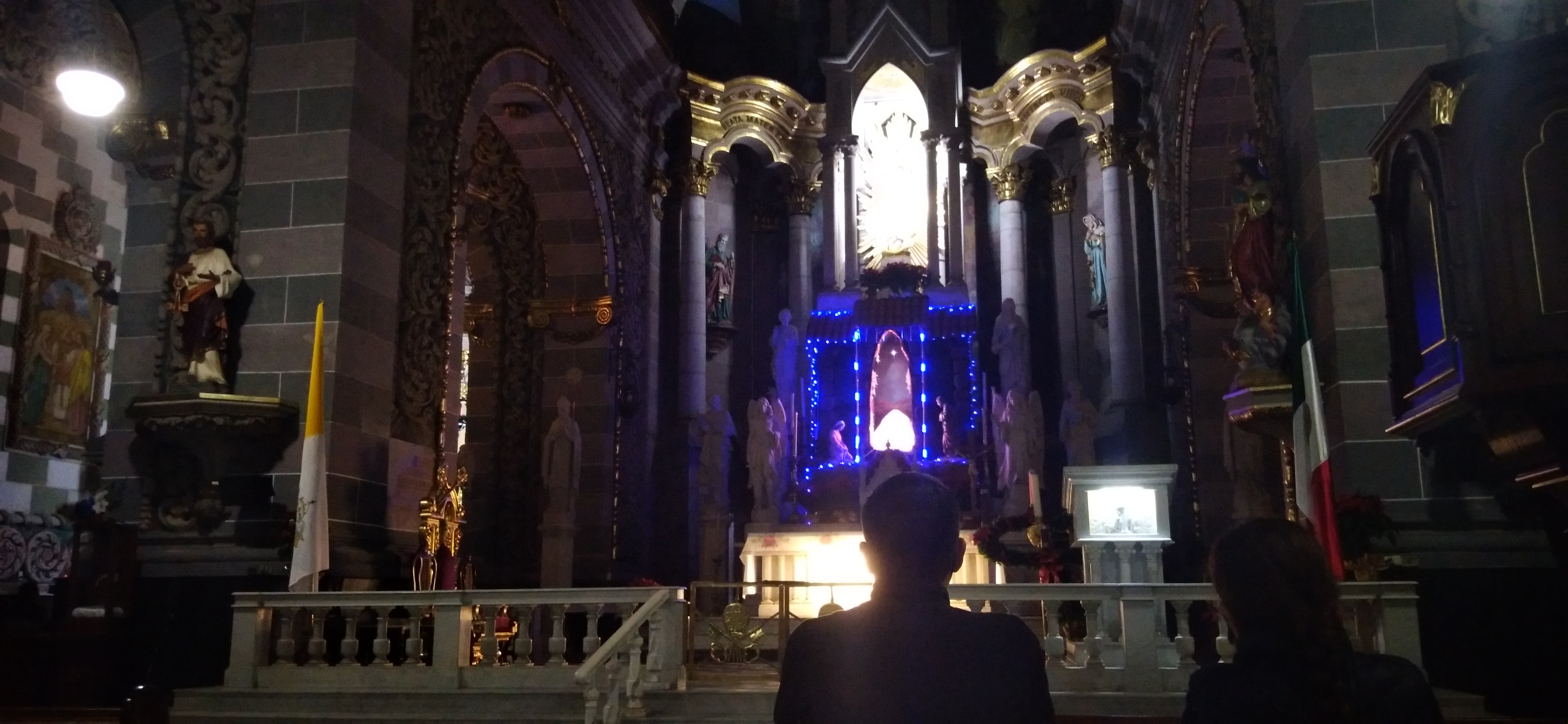
Interior of the cathedral on Christmas Eve

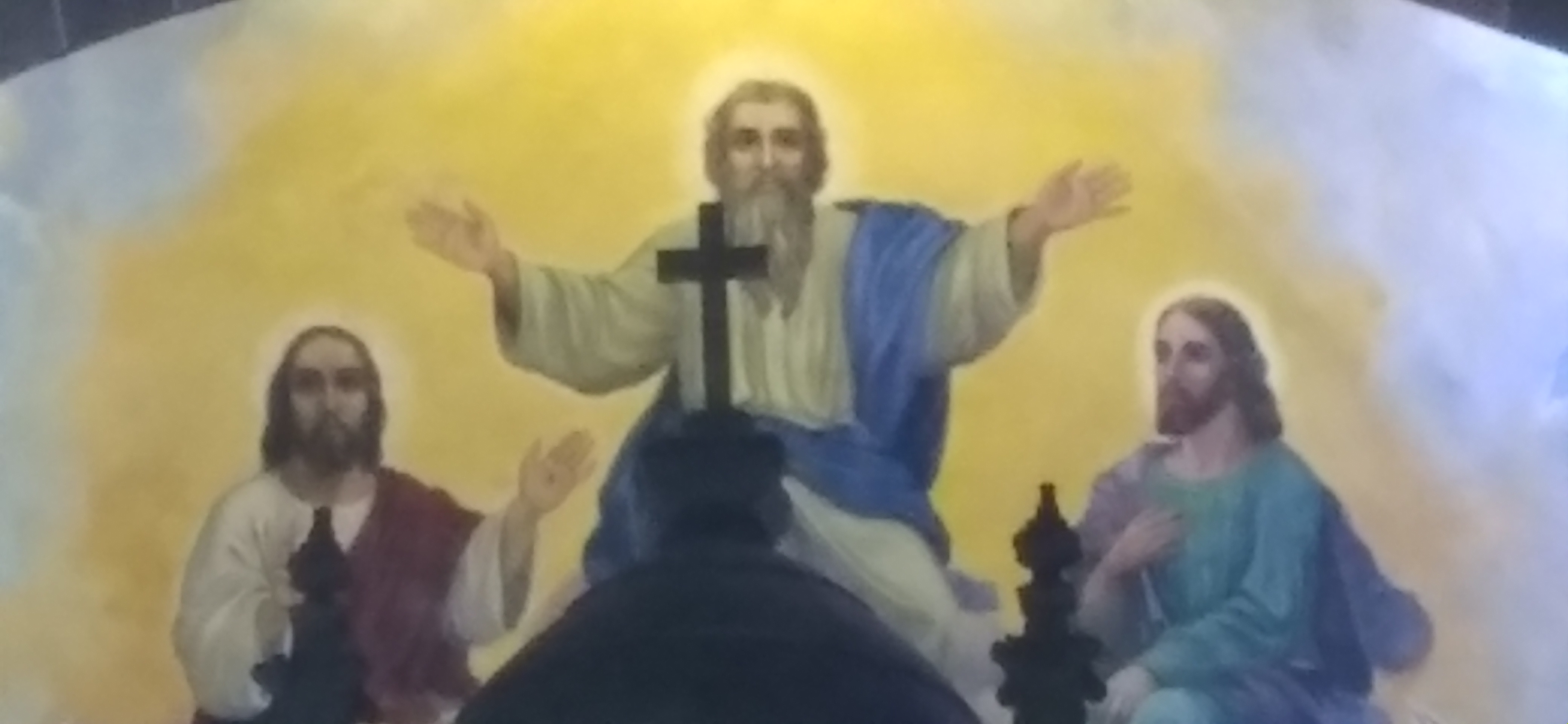
Holy Trinity fresco

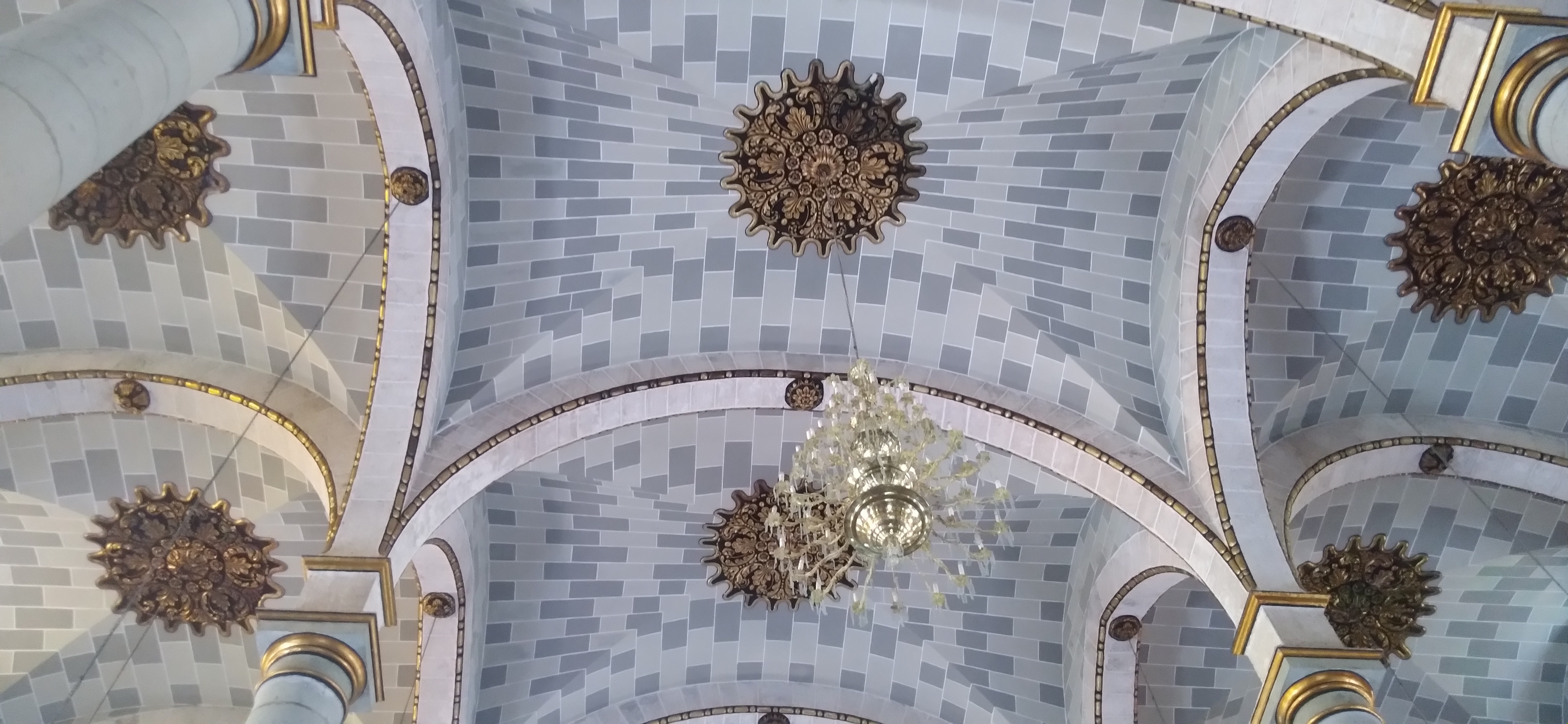
Interior ceiling

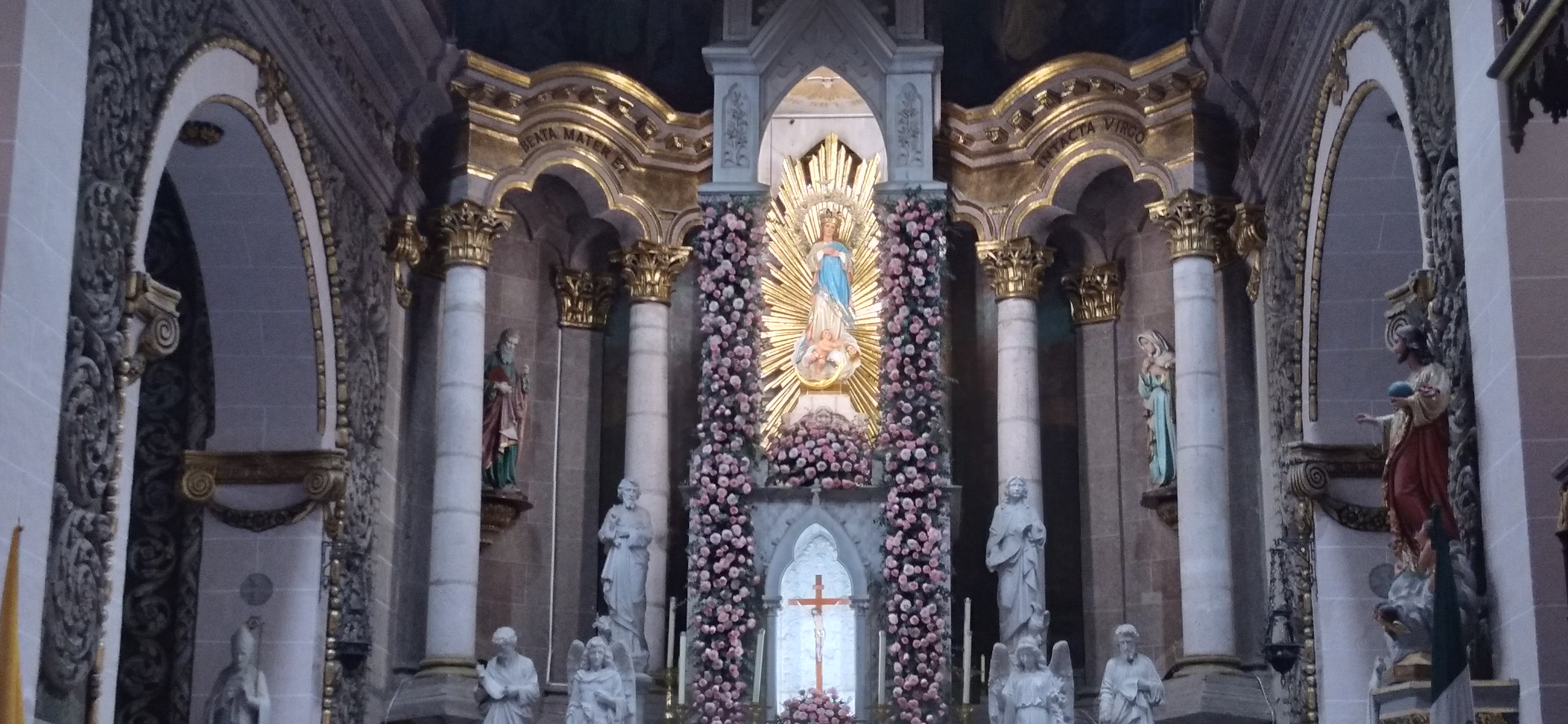
Altarpiece

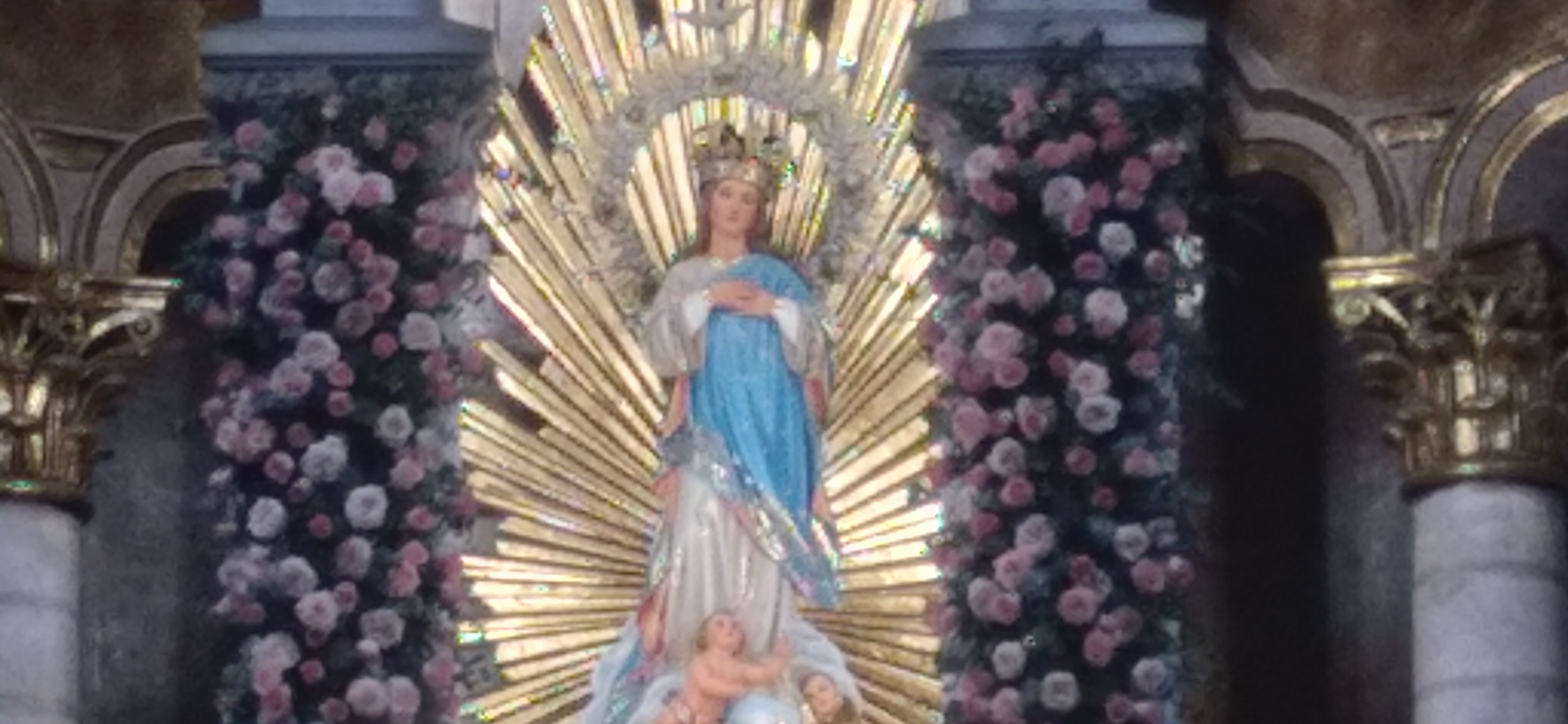
Immaculate Conception statue

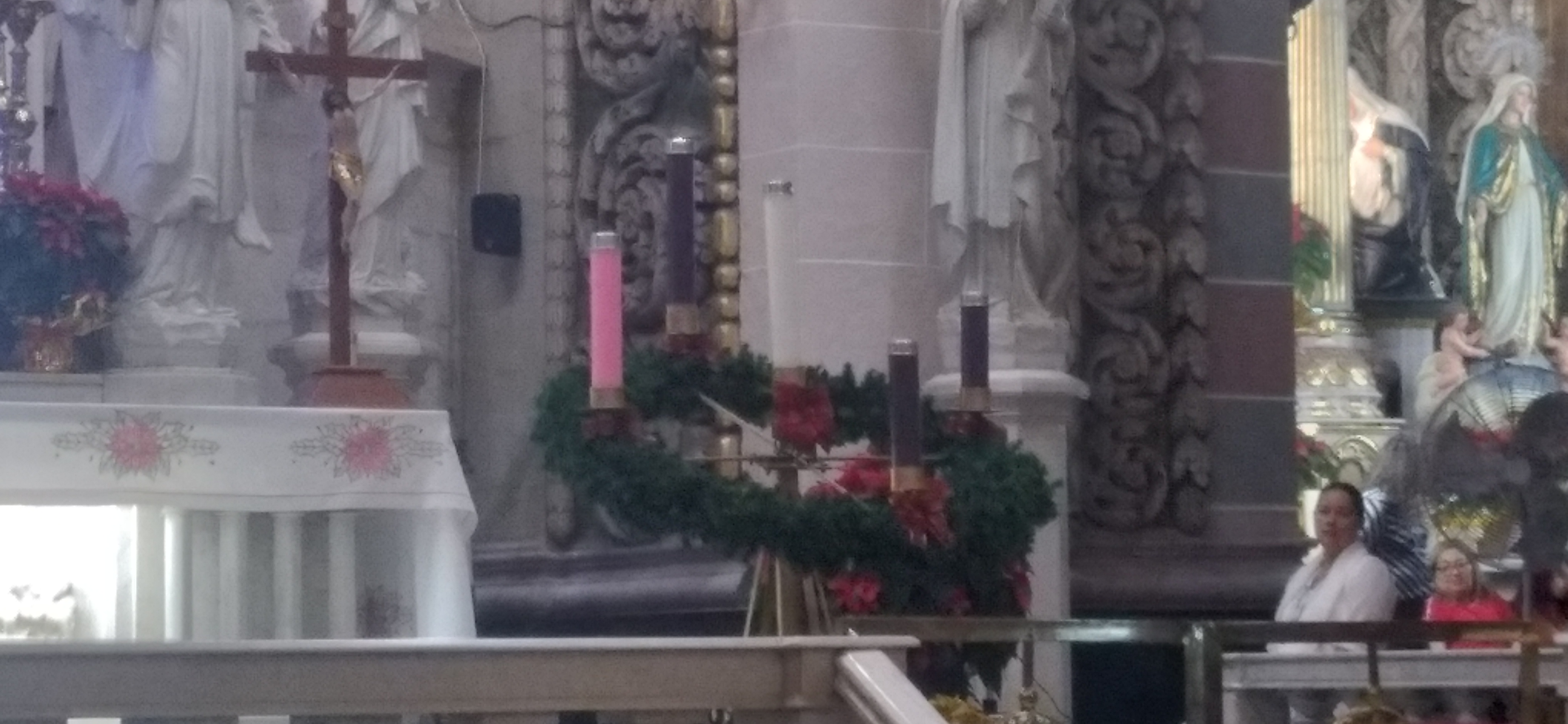
Advent wreath

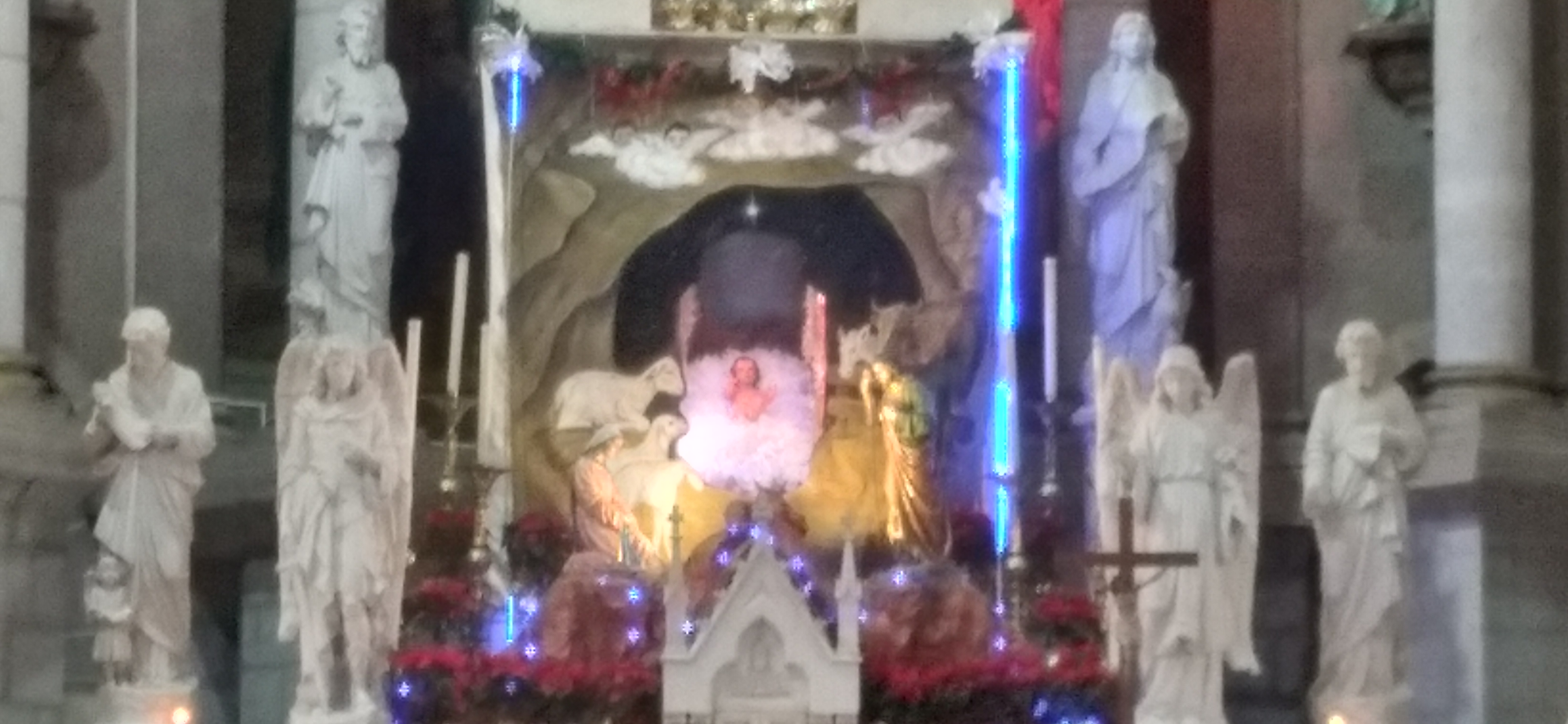
Nativity scene during Christmastide

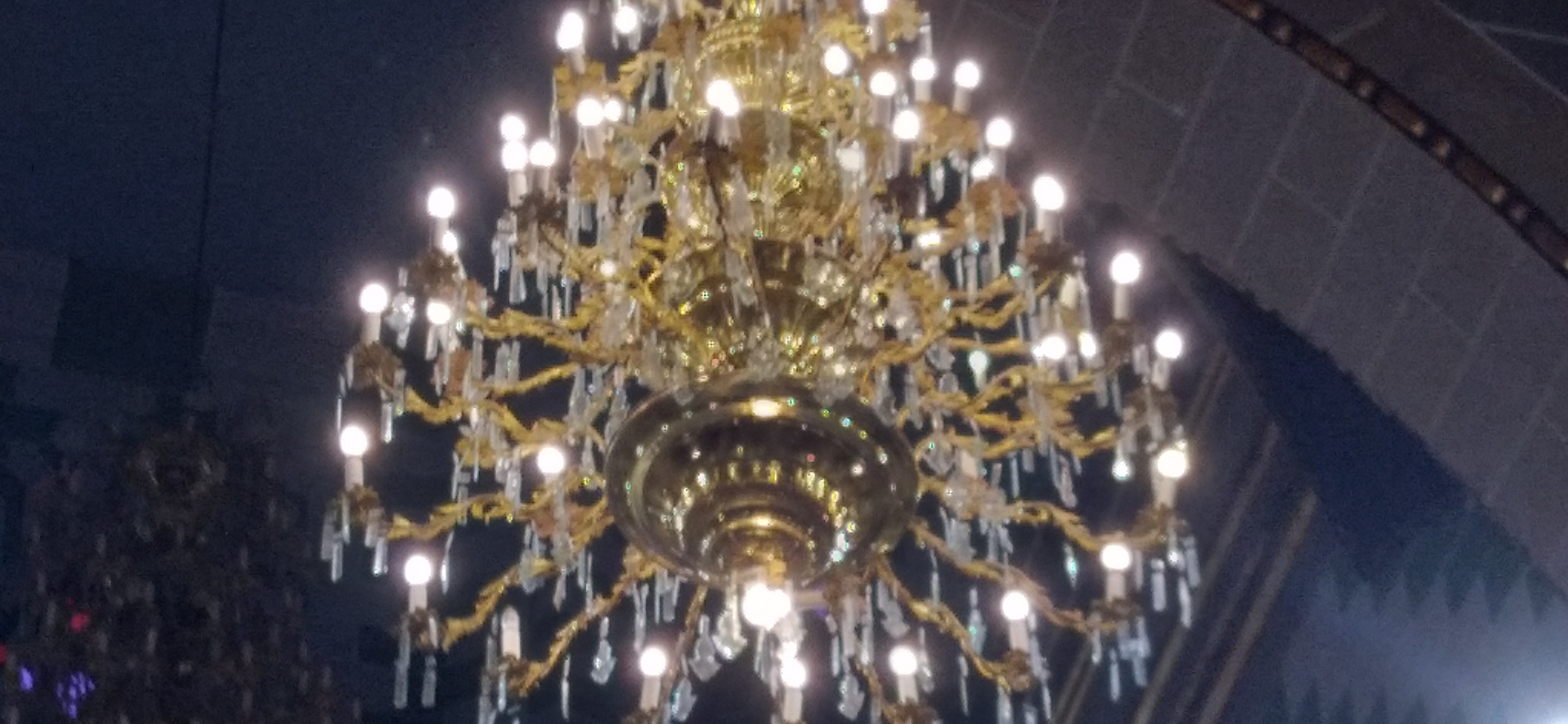
Chandelier

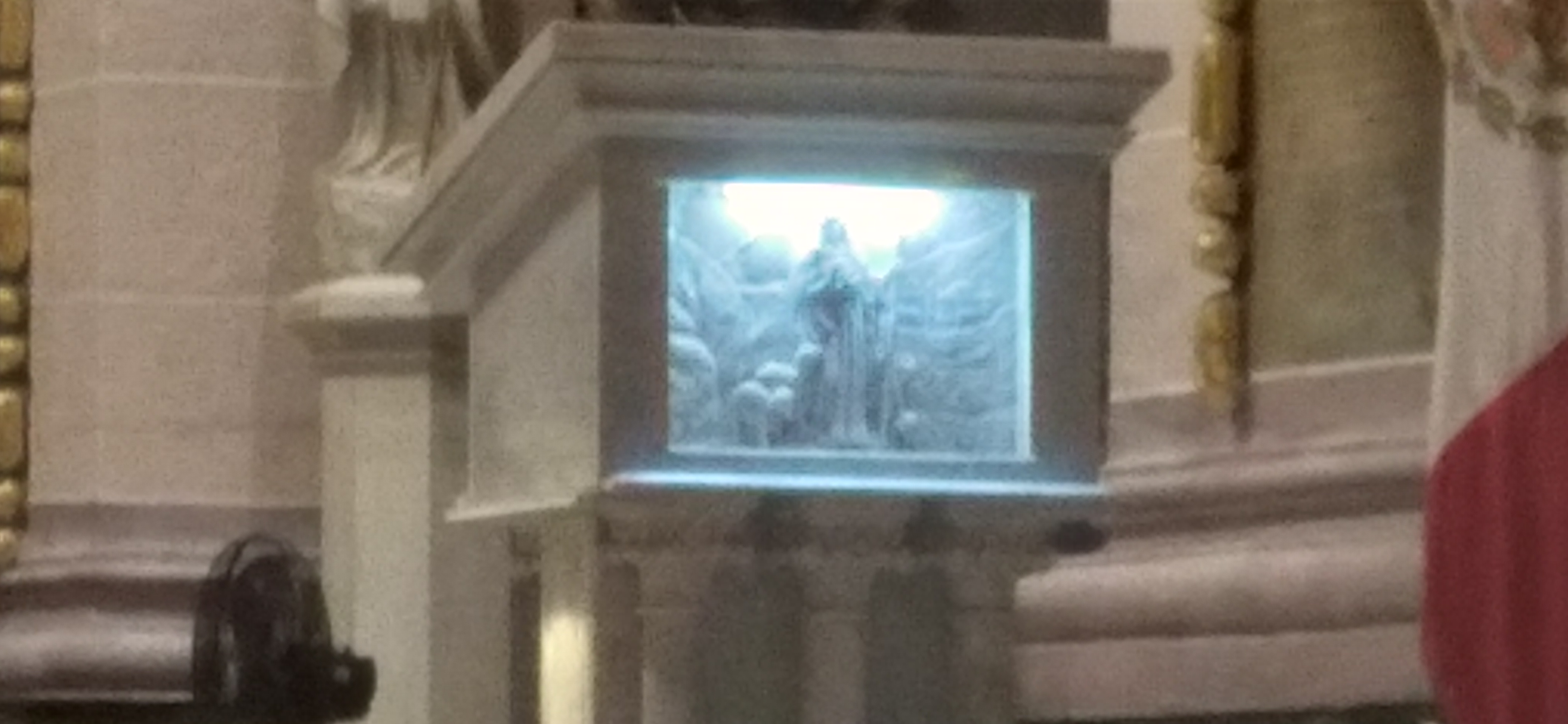
Ambo

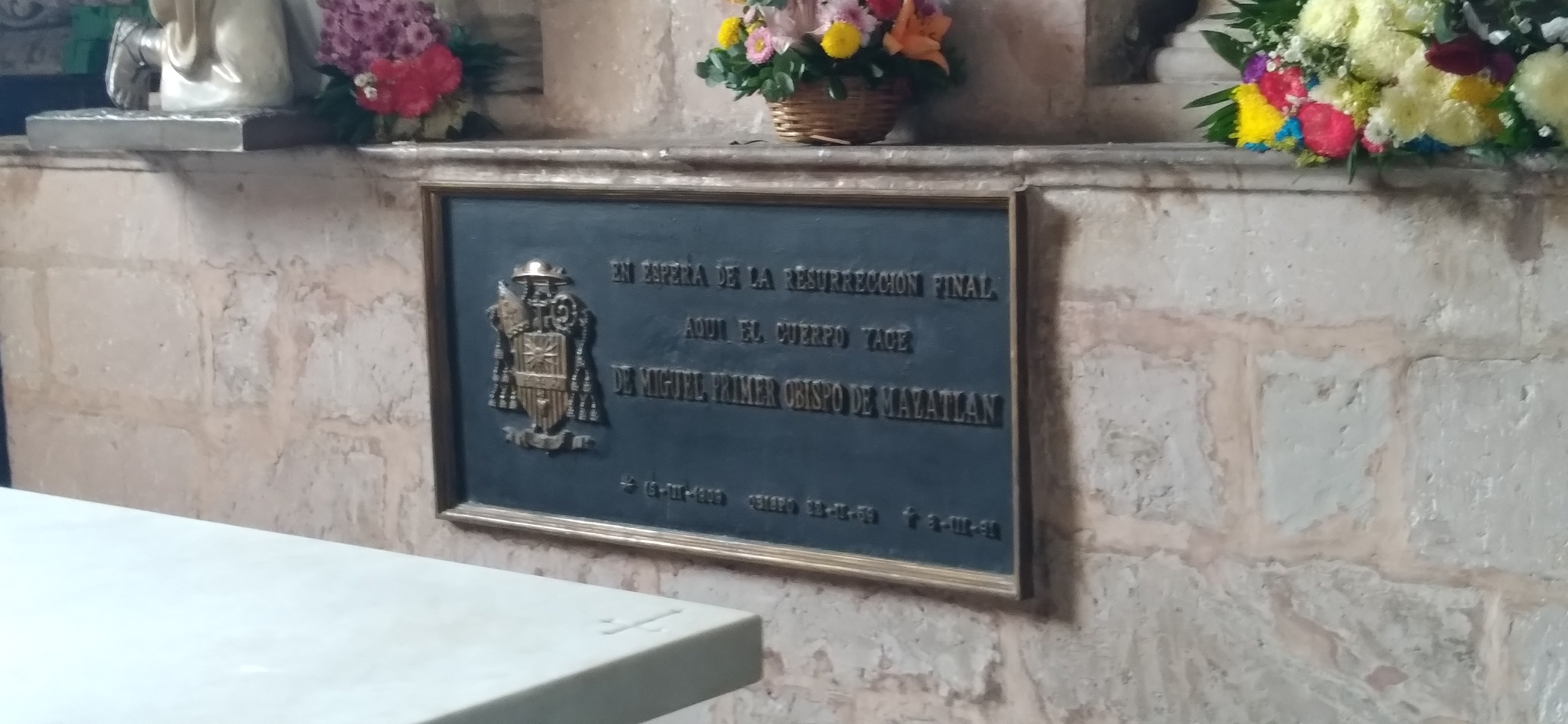
Tomb of Miguel García Franco

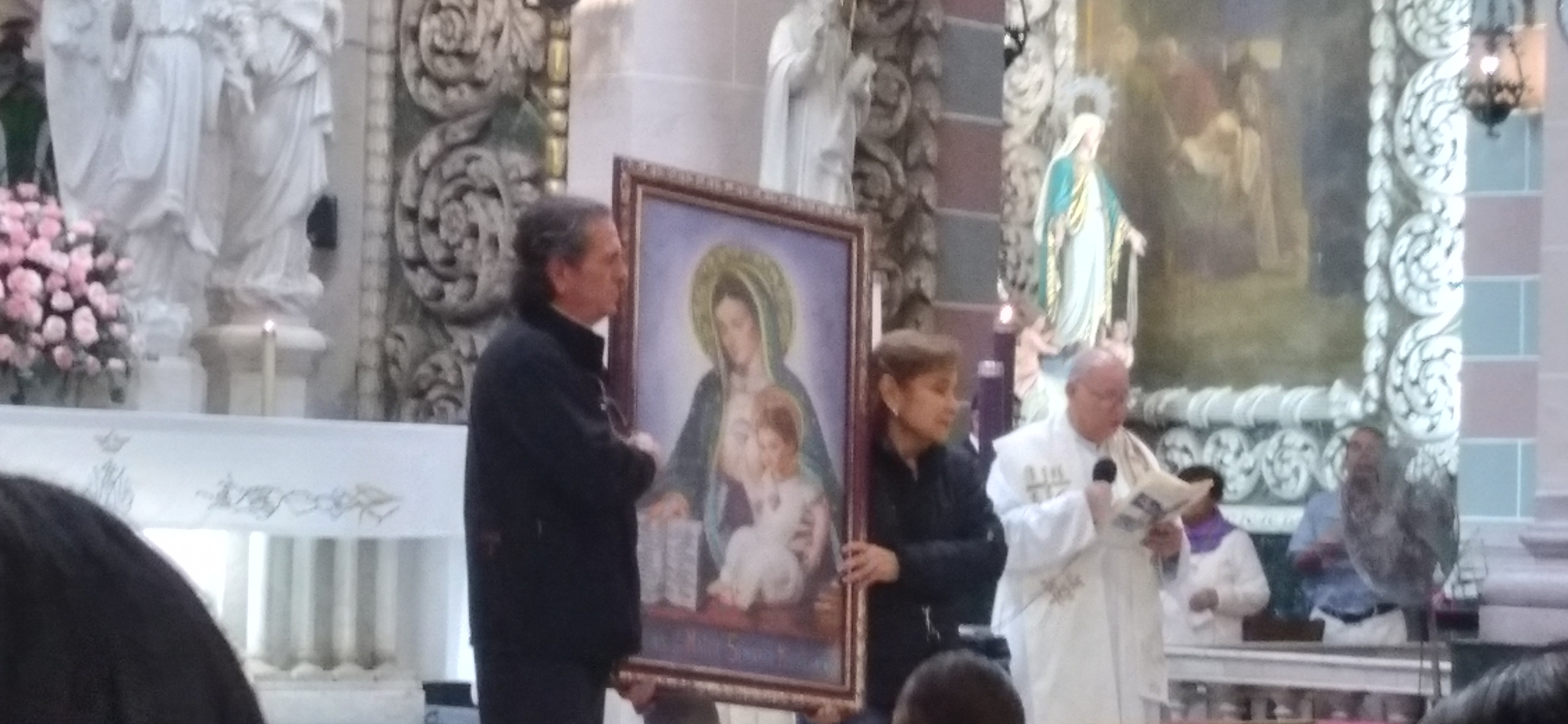
Painting of Our Lady of Guadalupe

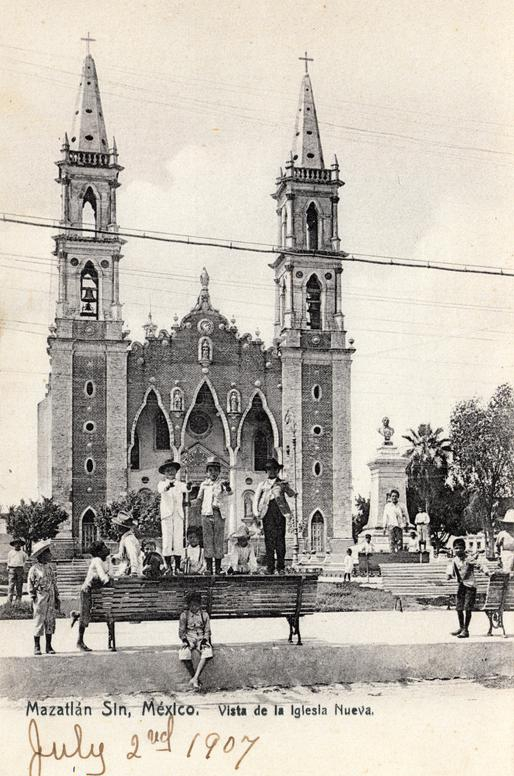
The cathedral in 1907

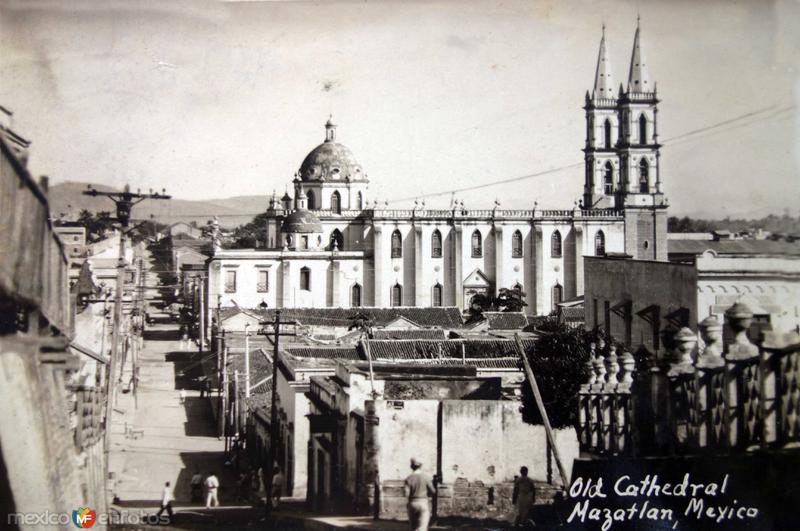
The cathedral in 1929

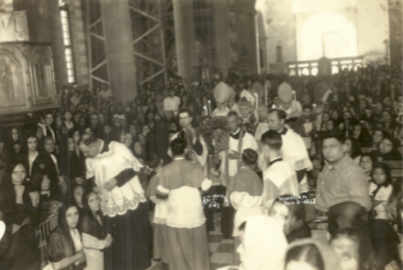
Dedication of the new basilica to the Immaculate Conception on November 8, 1938

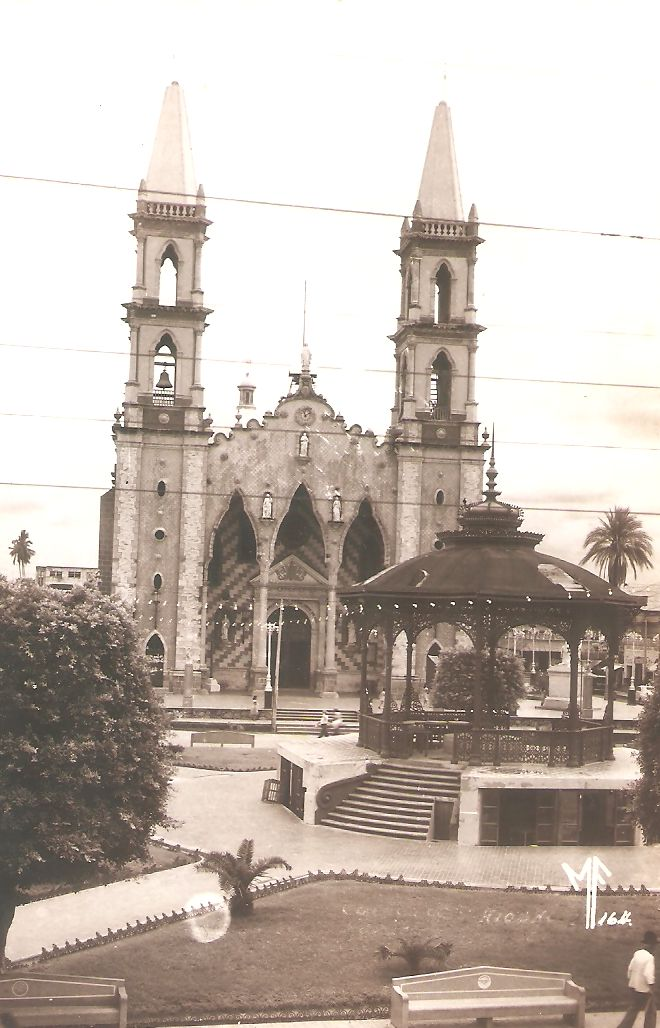
Plazuela República and the cathedral

== See also ==
- Roman Catholicism in Mexico
- Immaculate Conception
