= Mercado Pino Suárez =

Market in Mazatlán

Pino Suárez Market
- Mercado Pino Suárez
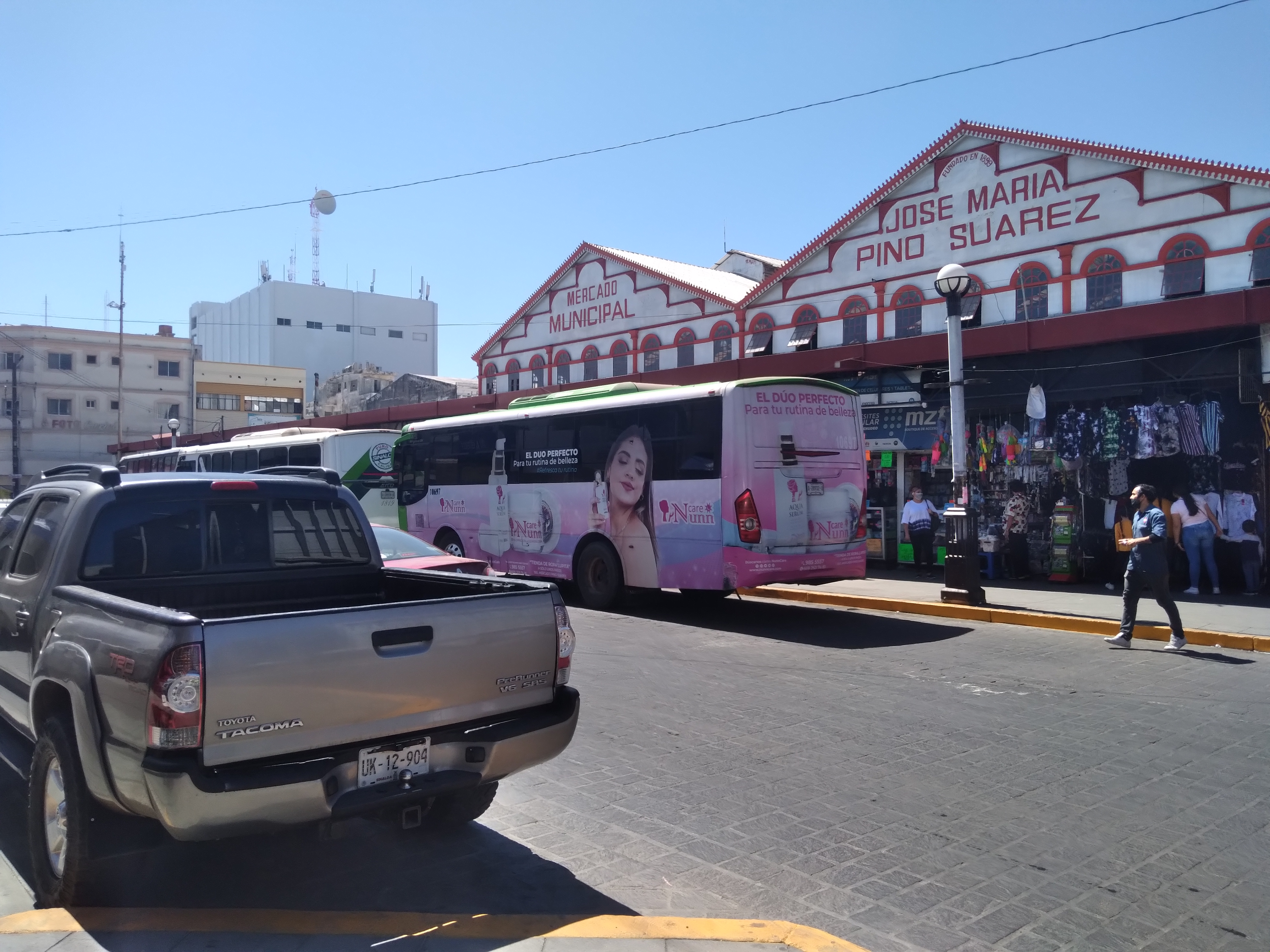
- Pino Suárez Market in 2022
- Interactive map of the Pino Suárez Market area
- Former names: Mercado Manuel Romero Rubio (May 5, 1899-February 13, 1915)
- Alternative names: Mercado Municipal José María Pino Suárez

General information
- Type: Covered market
- Location: Mazatlán, Mexico
- Coordinates: 23.202211°N 106.421146°W
- Named for: José María Pino Suárez
- Year built: 1895-1899
- Construction started: 1895
- Completed: 1899
- Opening: February 5, 1900
- Inaugurated: May 5, 1899
- Owner: Mazatlán Municipal Government

Technical details
- Floor count: 2

Design and construction
- Architect: Alejandro Loubet Guzmán

Website
- https://mercadopinosuarezmazatlan.com/

The Mercado Pino Suárez (officially known as Mercado Municipal José María Pino Suárez) is a municipal market in Mazatlán. During the first half of the 20th century, it became the commercial hub of the port.

== History ==
In 1895, the construction of the market was ordered; the markets that existed at that time operated outdoors and in unhealthy conditions. The market was designed by Alejandro Loubet Guzmán and took 5 years to build. It was founded on May 5, 1899, with the name of Mercado Manuel Romero Rubio, and was inaugurated by the then governor of the state Guillermo Cañedo. It opened its doors to the public on February 5, 1900.

On February 14, 1915, its name was changed to Mercado Pino Suárez in honor of the vice president of Mexico José María Pino Suárez, who was assassinated a year after visiting Mazatlán in 1913. The market has undergone several changes over time; during the first years of its existence on Benito Juárez Street there was a wide esplanade, where diners were installed; after 1910, the outside of the market was filled with stalls and in 1910, the city council authorized the installation of permanent stalls around the market. In 1951, renovation works were carried out on the market.

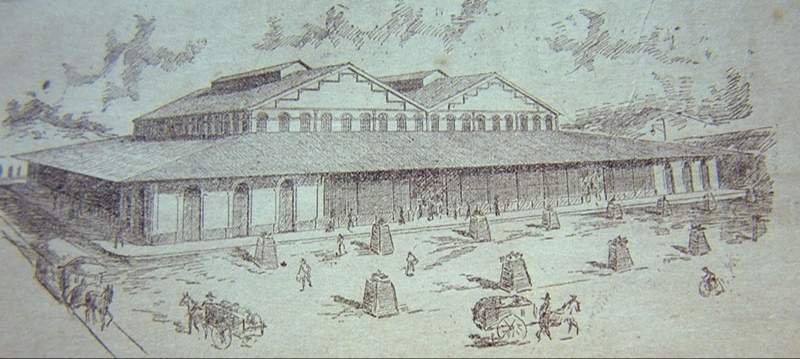
Old drawing of the market

In 2020, due to Covid 19, the market anniversary celebrations that took place every May 5 were postponed.

== Gallery ==
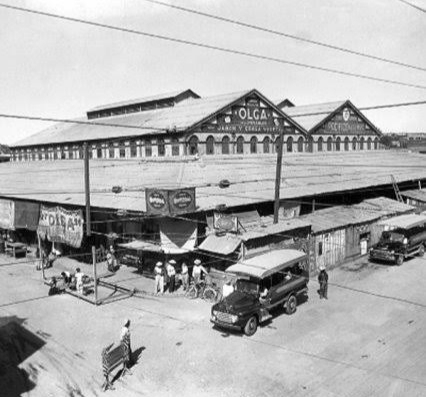
Pino Suárez Market in the 40s

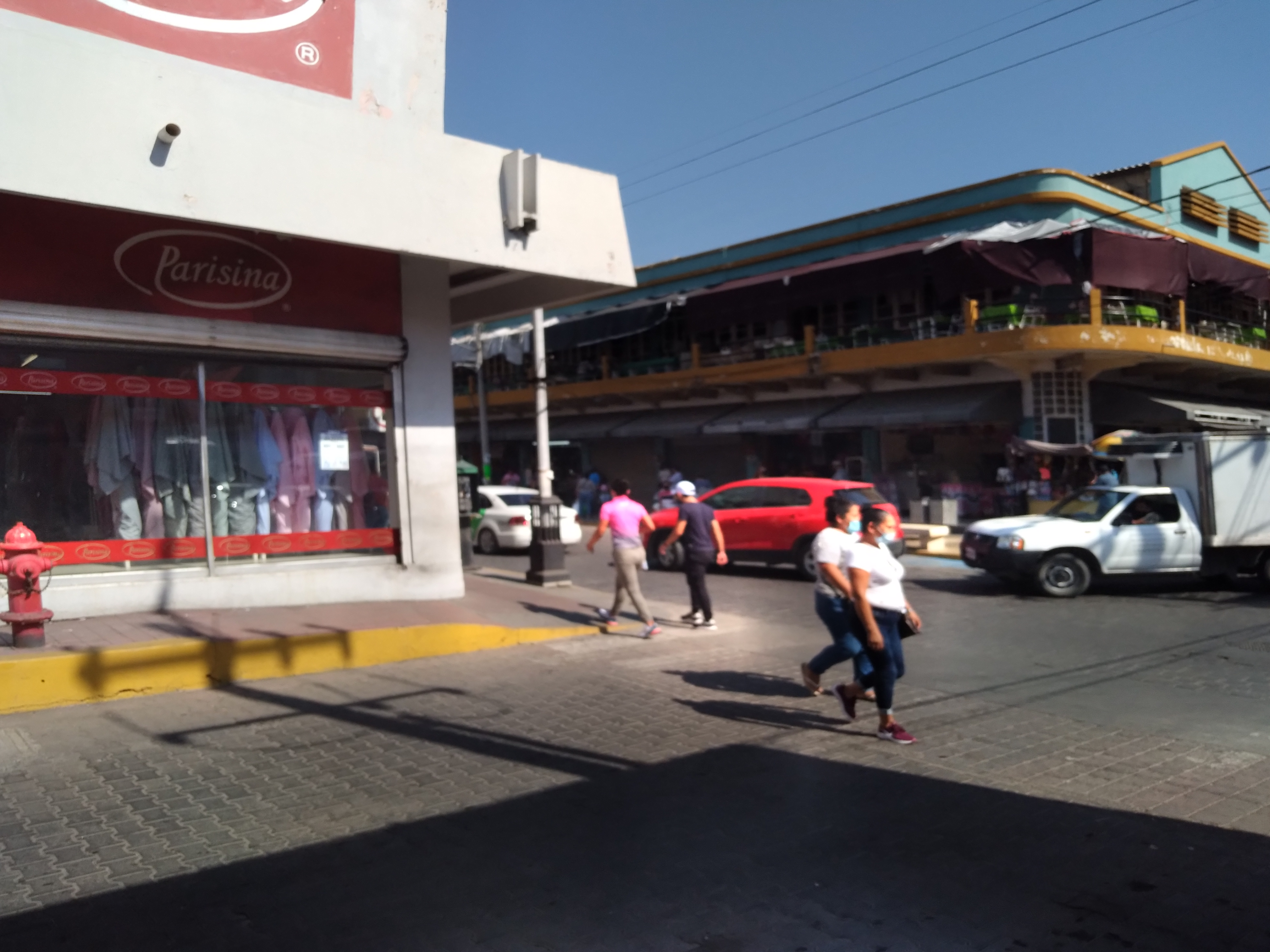
Market in 2021

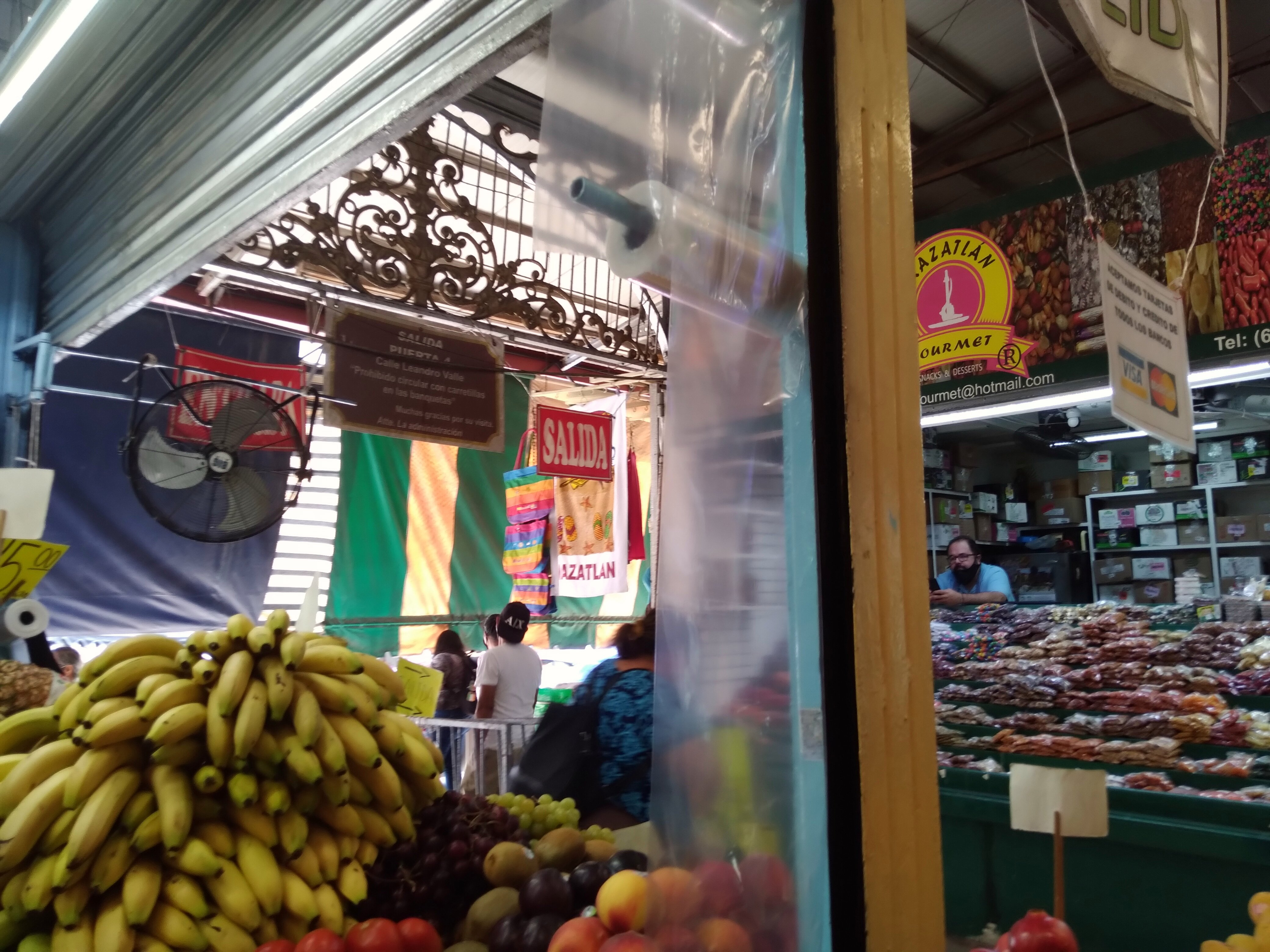
Interior of the market

== See also ==
Media related to Mercado Pino Suárez, Mazatlán at Wikimedia Commons
