= Cathedral Basilica of Durango =

Minor Basilica Cathedral of the Immaculate Conception of the metropolitan Archdiocese of the Victoria de Durango's Community
- Catedral Basílica Menor de la Inmaculada Concepción de la Arquidiócesis metropolitana de la comunidad de Victoria de Durango
- Minor Basilica Cathedral of the Immaculate Conception of the metropolitan Archdiocese of the Victoria de Durango's Community
- 24.0251°N 104.6703°W
- Location: Durango
- Country: Mexico
- Denomination: Roman Catholic Church

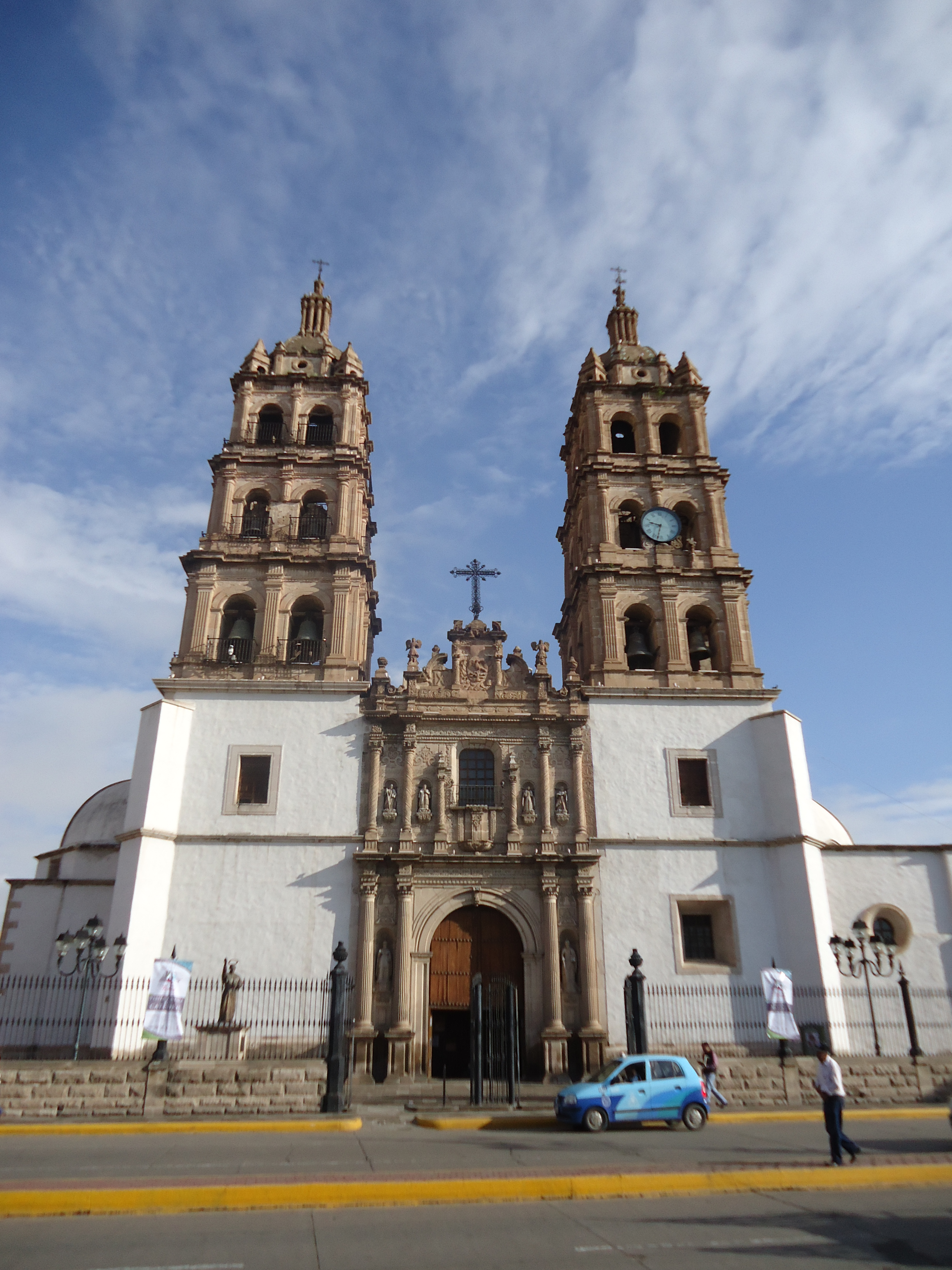
Main facade

The Minor Basilica Cathedral of the Immaculate Conception of the metropolitan Archdiocese of the Victoria de Durango's Community (Spanish: Catedral Basílica Menor de la Inmaculada Concepción de la Arquidiócesis metropolitana de la Comunidad de Victoria de Durango), also called the Durango Cathedral, is a religious building in the Catholic Church that belongs to the Metropolitan Archdiocese of Durango in Mexico. It is located in the historic center of the city of Victoria de Durango, opposite the Plaza de Armas. It is the state's most important architectural representation, and one of the most beautiful buildings in the north of the country. It takes the place of the old parish of the Assumption.

The current building was built around 1695 and was designed by the architect Mateo Nuñez. The work was partially completed in 1713 and was terminated formally in 1844, after the completion of the interior decoration, altars, and well-known monuments in the cathedral.

== See also ==
- Roman Catholicism in Mexico
