= El Riego phase =

The El Riego phase is a Mexican archaeological period in the Tehuacan Valley Sequence that came to pass during the early part of the Archaic period in the Americas. The El Riego phase is the second period in the sequence; preceding it was the Ajuereado phase, and the Coxcatlan phase came later. Dating for the El Riego phase differs slightly from source to source, it has been said to have occurred from as wide a span as 8650 - 5700 BC to as narrow as 6800 - 5000 BC.

== Tehuacan Valley Sequence ==
The Tehuacan Valley Sequence was a project directed by Richard MacNeish which involved an archaeological survey of the Tehuacan Valley and excavations at various archaeological sites in the region - six excavated sites and seven surface sites. The findings of the project allowed the entirety of the occupation of the Tehuacan Valley to be understood. This sequence provided the first broad perspective of the transition from a foraging society to a village farming society in Mesoamerica. Dates established for the El Riego phase are based on sixteen radiocarbon assays.

== Social organization ==
The social organization of the El Riego phase is characteristic of the Early Archaic period in Mesoamerica; hunter gatherer societies with established seasonal camps. The two types of camps being used in the Tehuacan Valley at this time were dry season micro-band camps used by small bands often consisting of a single family, and wet season macro-band camps used by numerous bands or families. The hunter gatherer peoples traveled between the camps to follow the migration of the wild animals they hunted.

== Subsistence practices ==
Subsistence during the El Riego phase was reliant on wild animals and plants. In the earlier part of the phase the people were most likely seasonal nomads, moving from small hunting camps and temporary villages. Throughout the El Riego phase plants grew increasingly important to the peoples, and towards the end of the phase there may have been experimental domestication and planting of native plant species such as squash, chili, and avocado.

== Material culture and spirituality ==
Through the archaeological excavations done on important sites such as Tecorral, Coxcatlán, Purron, and Abejas, material culture from the El Riego phase has been discovered and consists largely of stone tools, evidence of weaving through the discovery of blankets and baskets, and woodworking through the findings of dart shafts and animal traps. Numerous scraper planes and food-grinding stones dating to the El Riego phase were discovered at Coxcatlán Cave, as well as projectile points with greater form diversity than seen previously. The first evidence of deliberate burials has been found to date to the El Riego phase, as well as potential evidence of the first instances of human sacrifice.
