= Diocese of Mazatlán =

Roman Catholic diocese in Mexico

Diocese of Mazatlán Dioecesis Mazatlanensis Diócesis de Mazatlán
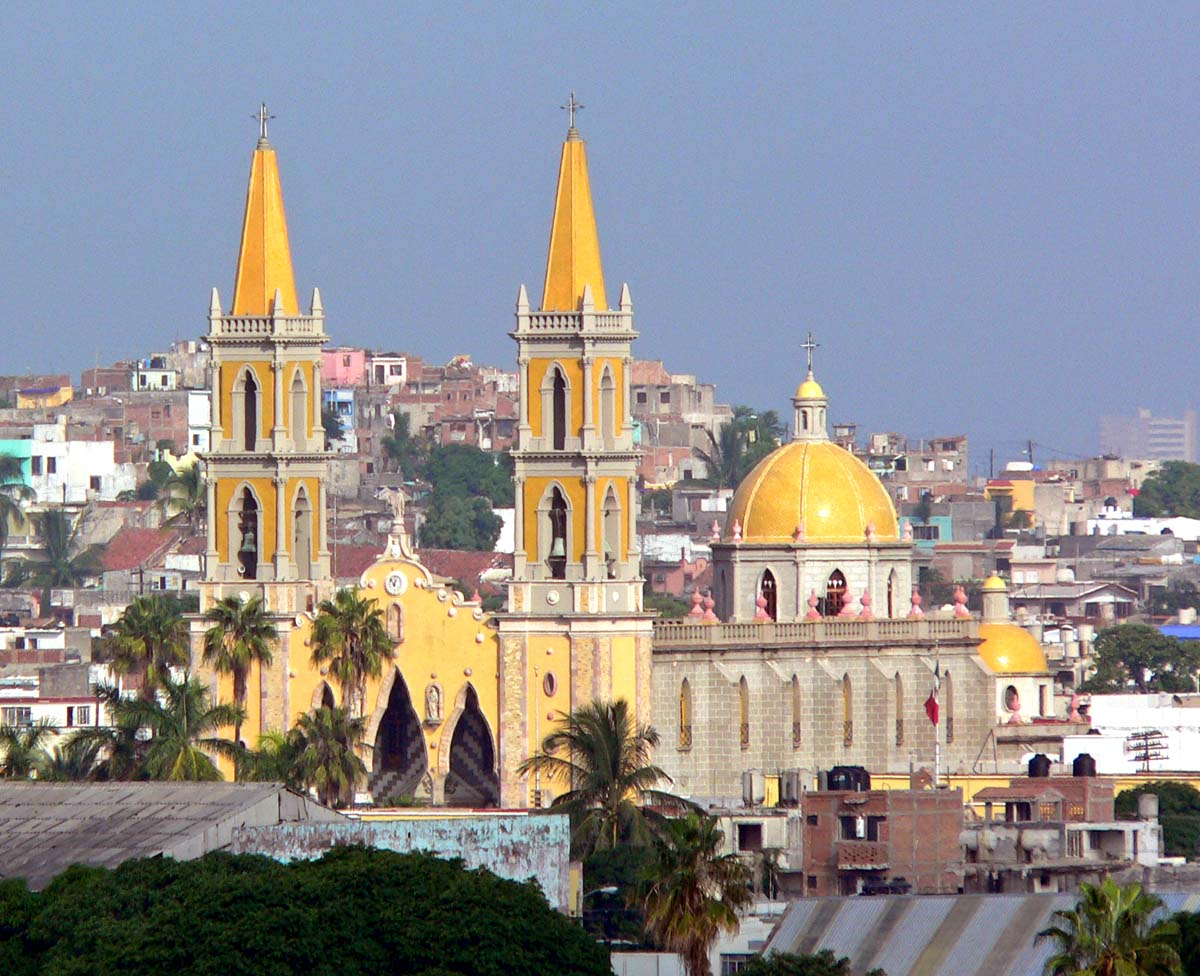
- Catedral Basílica de la Inmaculada Concepción

Location
- Country: Mexico
- Ecclesiastical province: Province of Durango
- Metropolitan: Mazatlán
- Coordinates: 23.2010°N 106.4219°W

Statistics
- Area: 7,379 sq mi (19,110 km^{2})
- Population: Total; Catholics: (as of 2006); 765,248; 711,691 (93%)
- Parishes: 40

Information
- Denomination: Roman Catholic
- Rite: Roman Rite
- Established: 22 November 1958 (66 years ago)
- Cathedral: Cathedral Basilica of the Immaculate Conception
- Patron saint: Immaculate Conception; Saint Peter; Saint Paul

Current leadership
- Pope: Leo XIV
- Bishop: Mario Espinosa Contreras
- Vicar General: Jaime Aguilar Martínez

Map
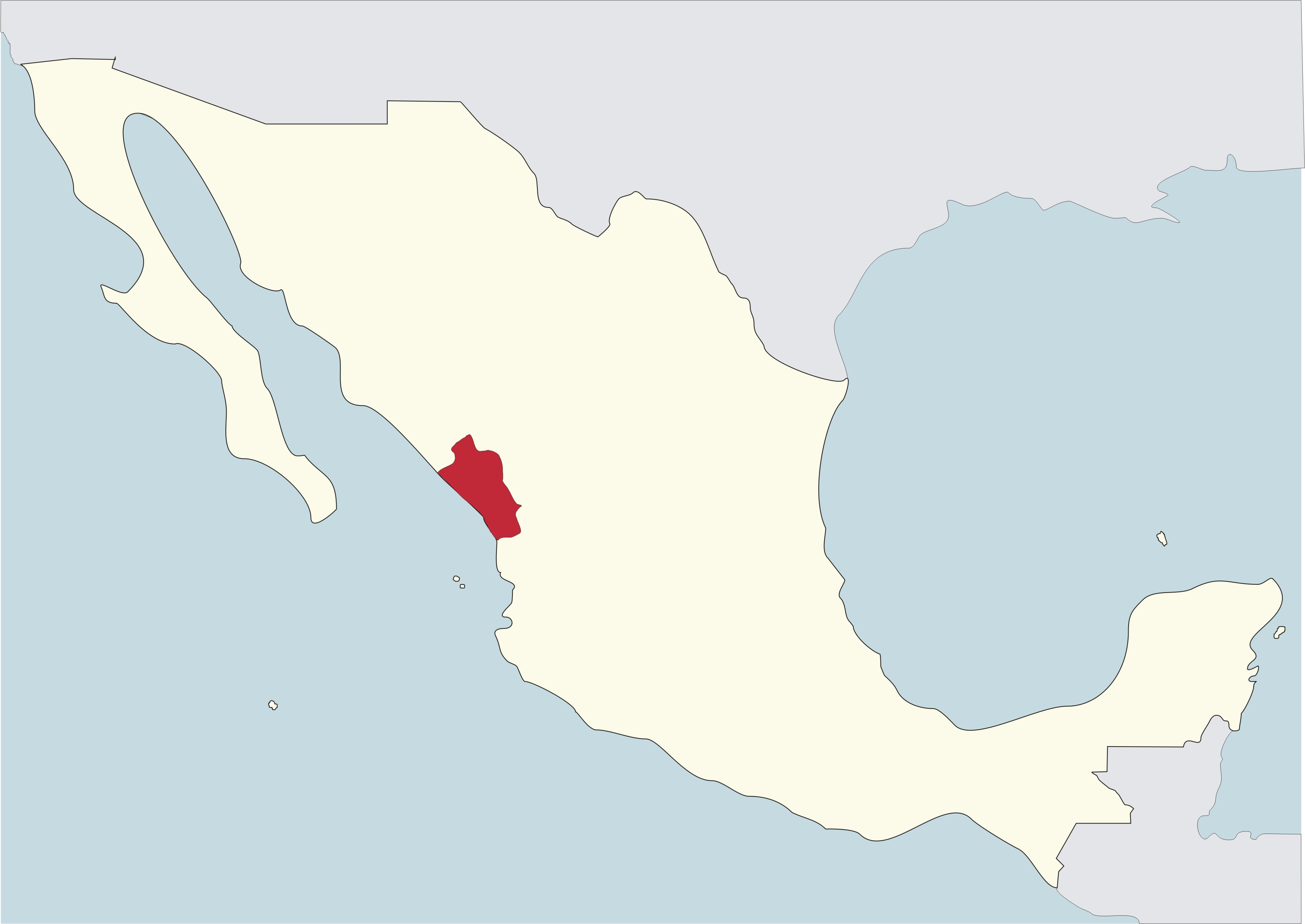

Website
- https://m.facebook.com/diocesismzt/

The Roman Catholic Diocese of Mazatlán (Latin: Dioecesis Mazatlanensis) is a suffragan diocese of the Archdiocese of Durango. It was erected in 1958 and, along with the archdiocese, lost territory in 1968 to form the Territorial Prelature of El Salto.

== Ordinaries ==
- Miguel García Franco (1958 - 1981)
- Rafael Barraza Sánchez (1981 - 2005)
- Mario Espinosa Contreras (2005 - )

== Episcopal See ==
- Mazatlán, Sinaloa

== See also ==
- Cathedral Basilica of the Immaculate Conception, Mazatlán
- Templo de San José, Mazatlán
- Parroquia Cristo Rey, Mazatlán
- Virgen de La Puntilla, Mazatlán

== External links and references ==
- "Diocese of Mazatlán". Catholic-Hierarchy.
