= Mario Espinosa Contreras =

Mexican bishop

His Excellency Mario Espinoza Contreras
- Bishop of Mazatlán
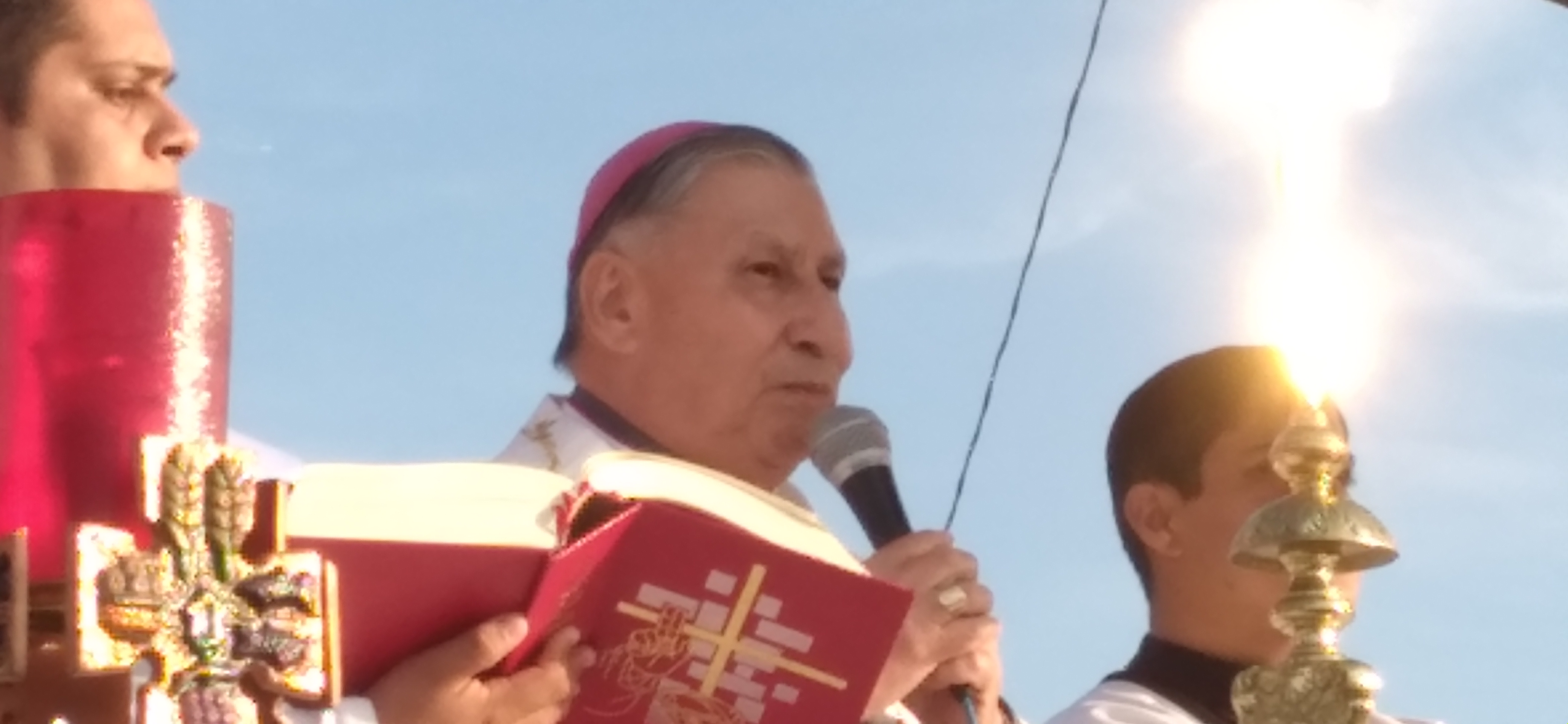
- The bishop during a mass at the Virgen de La Puntilla
- Church: Catholic Church
- Diocese: Roman Catholic Diocese of Mazatlán
- Appointed: 2 April 1996
- In office: 2005-present
- Predecessor: Rafael Barraza Sánchez

Orders
- Ordination: 14 July 1973
- Consecration: 11 May 1996 by Adolfo Antonio Suárez Rivera

Personal details
- Born: 22 November 1949 (age 76) Tepic, Nayarit
- Coat of arms

Mario Espinosa Contreras (22 November 1949) is a Roman Catholic bishop who serves as Bishop of the Roman Catholic Diocese of Mazatlán in Mexico since 2005.

Born on November 22, 1949, in Tepic, Nayarit, Mexico, Mario Espinosa Contreras became a priest in his hometown and later bishop in Tehuacán and Mazatlán, In 2024, he spoke about the kidnapping of 66 people in Culiacán during the Palm Sunday mass from the altar of the Basilica Cathedral of Mazatlán.
