= Virgen de La Puntilla, Mazatlán =

Statue in Mazatlán

Virgen de La Puntilla
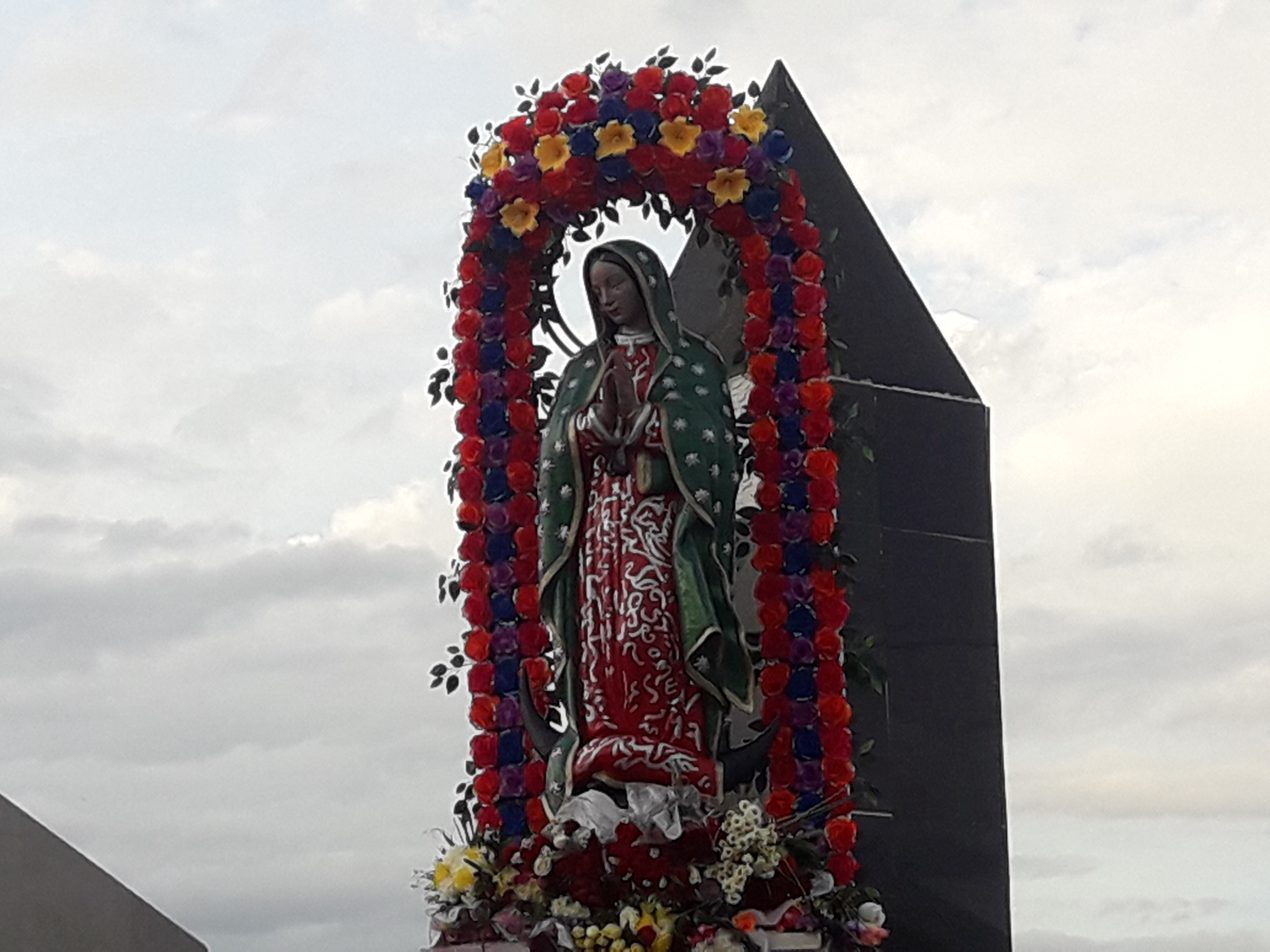
- Interactive map of Virgen de La Puntilla
- Location: Mazatlán, Mexico
- Coordinates: 23.188232°N 106.416947°W
- Type: Statue and obelisk
- Beginning date: 1972
- Completion date: 1975
- Opening date: 1975
- Dedicated to: Our Lady of Guadalupe

The Virgen de La Puntilla (Virgin of La Puntilla) is a statue of Our Lady of Guadalupe in Mazatlán in the Mexican state of Sinaloa.

It consists of a regular-sized statue on a small pedestal. It is located in the Colonia Lázaro Cárdenas, next to the pier.

== History ==
Its construction was planned in 1972 as a proposal by fishermen and Miguel García Franco, who was bishop of the Roman Catholic Diocese of Mazatlán. It was built by sculptors from the city and had the purpose of protecting the port from natural phenomena. The port complex was under construction at that time. The sculpture was placed in 1975, the year Hurricane Olivia hit. Since then, the phrase has been read on its pedestal: Mother of the church, queen of the sea and the universe.

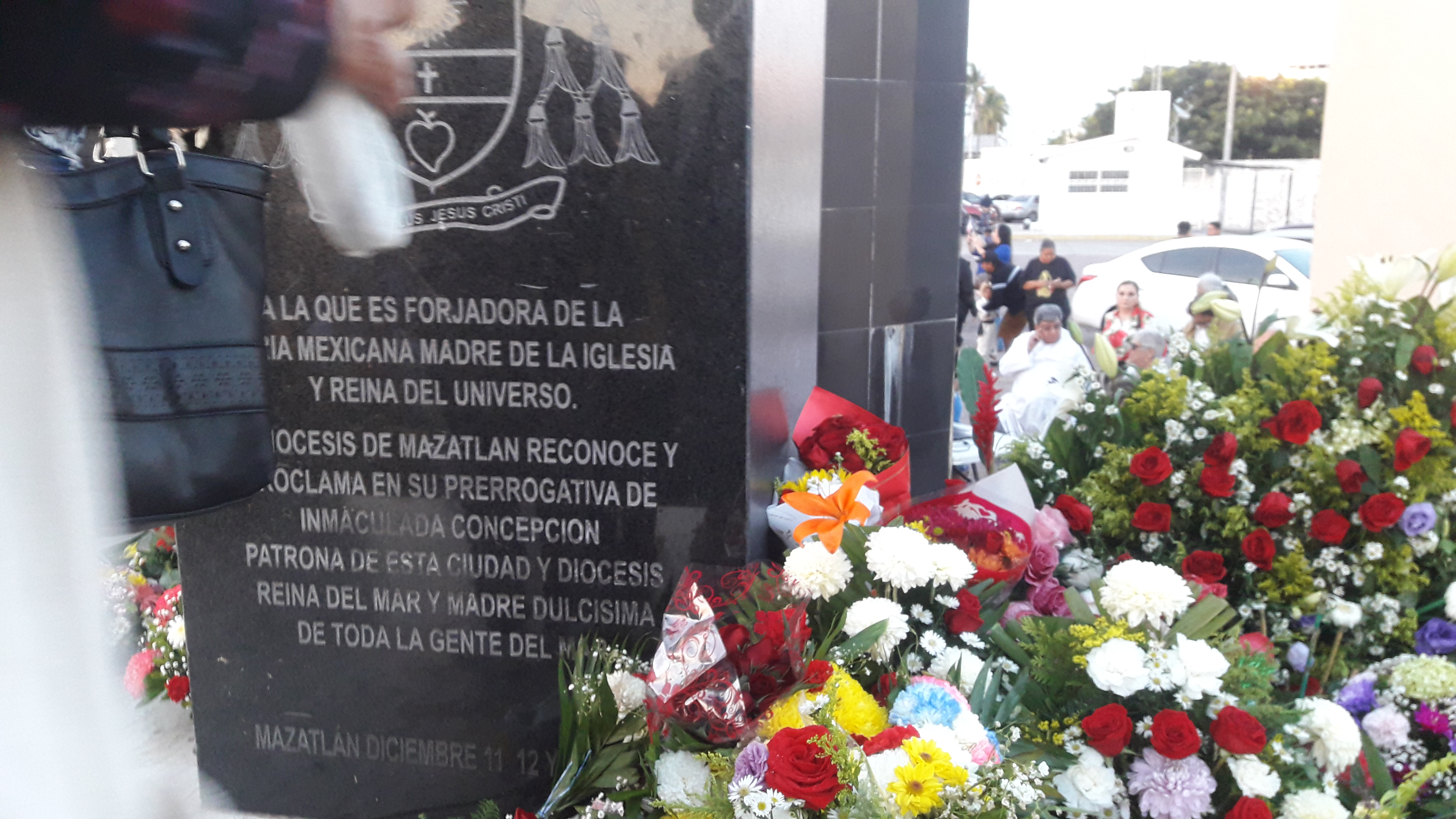
On the pedestal of the statue of the Virgin the phrase in Spanish reads "To the one who is the forger of the Mexican homeland, mother of the church and queen of the universe. The diocese of Mazatlán recognizes and proclaims in its prerogative of immaculate conception, patron saint of this city and diocese, queen of the sea and sweetest mother of all the people of the sea."

On September 30, 2019, Tropical Storm Narda toppled the statue, despite this, it was not destroyed and was replaced in its place.

Two masses are celebrated each year in honor of the Virgin: on September 12 in memory of the fishermen who lost their lives in Hurricane Ismael, and on December 12, the Day of the Lady of Guadalupe in the Catholic religion. Processions are also held in the streets.

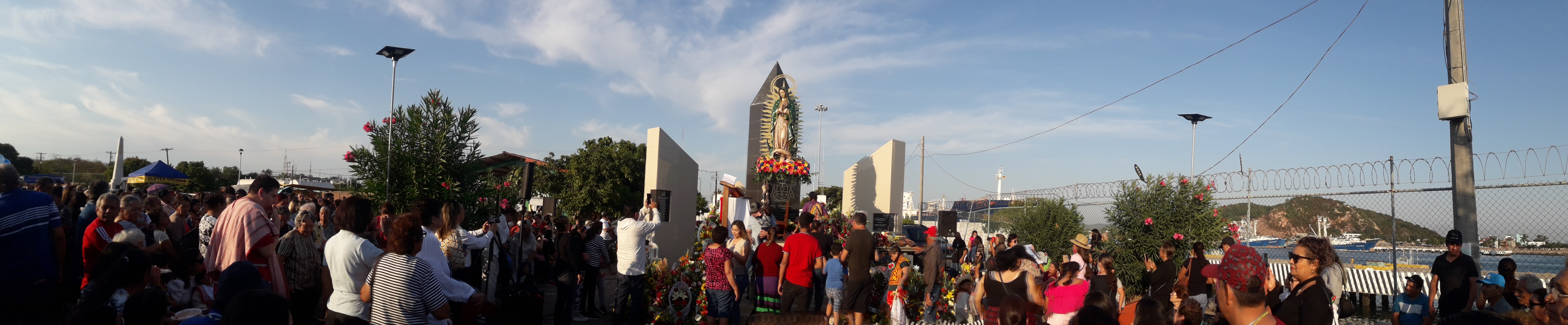
Panoramic view of the pier with the Virgin of La Puntilla

== Gallery ==
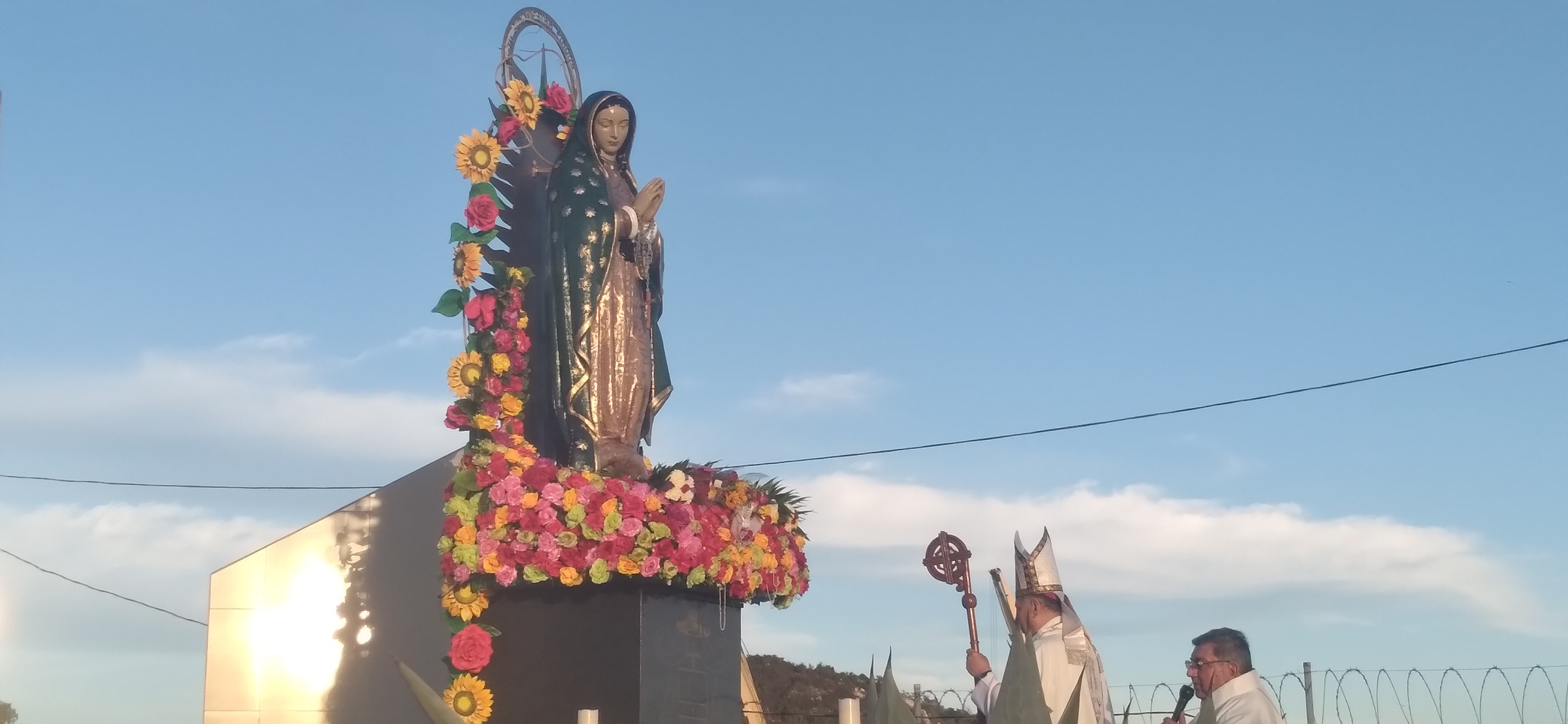
Virgen de La Puntilla in 2023

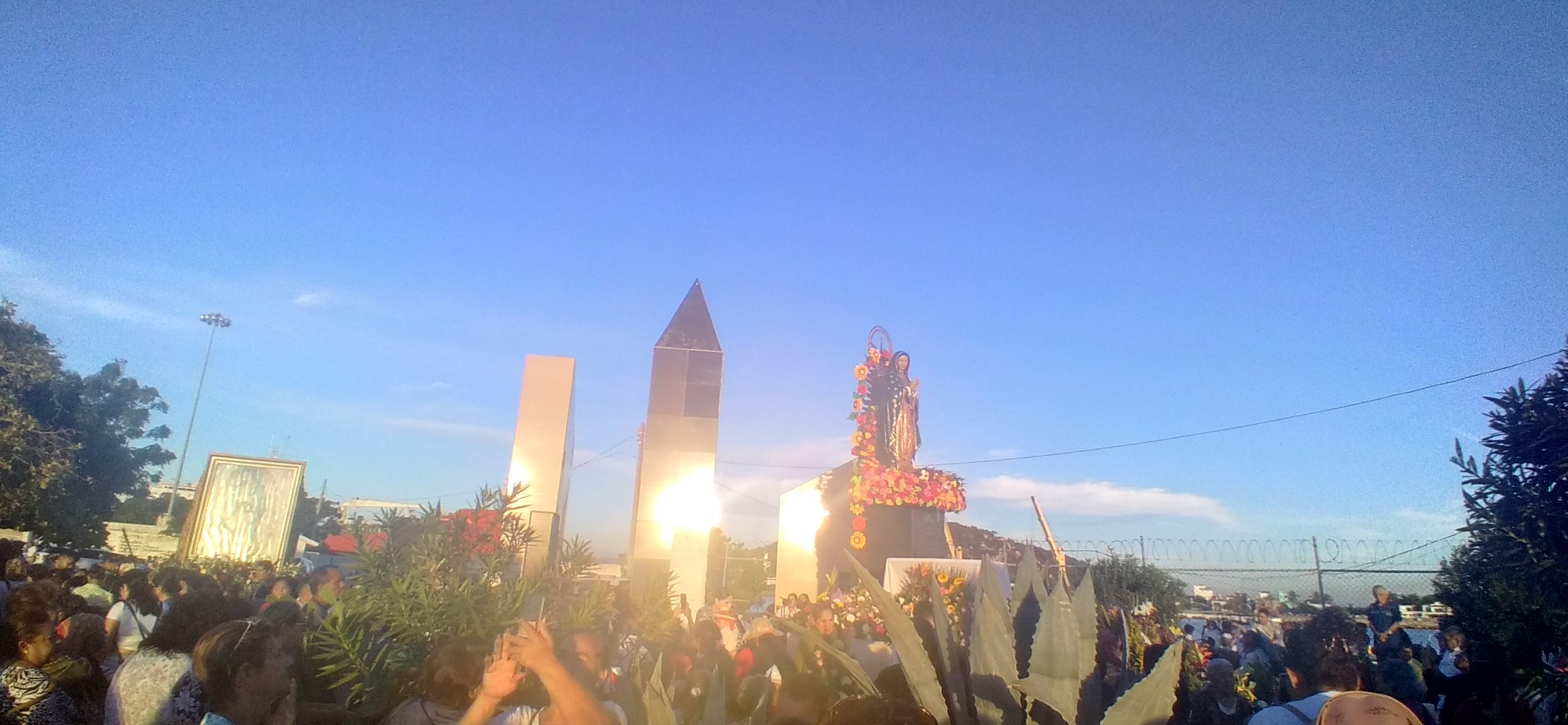
Distant view of the statue

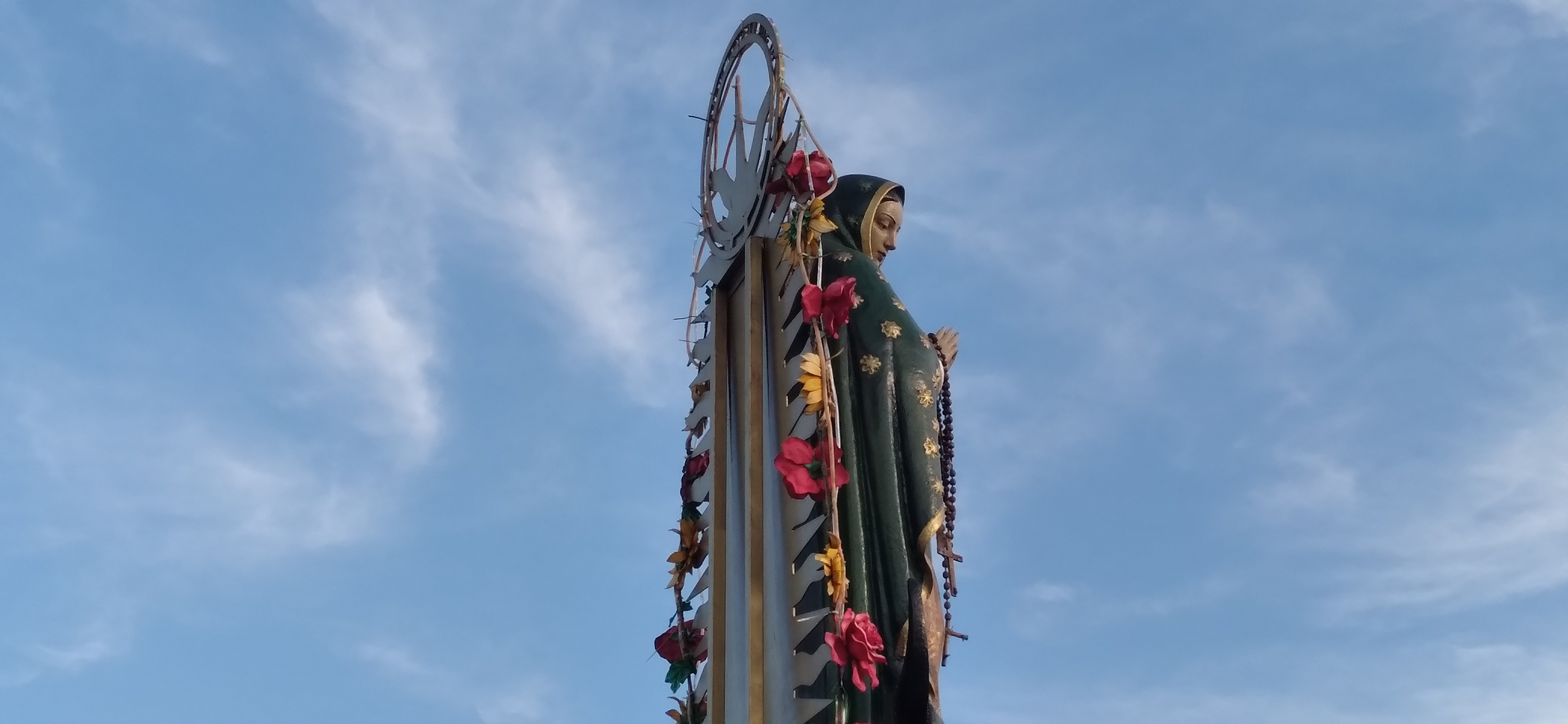
Rear view

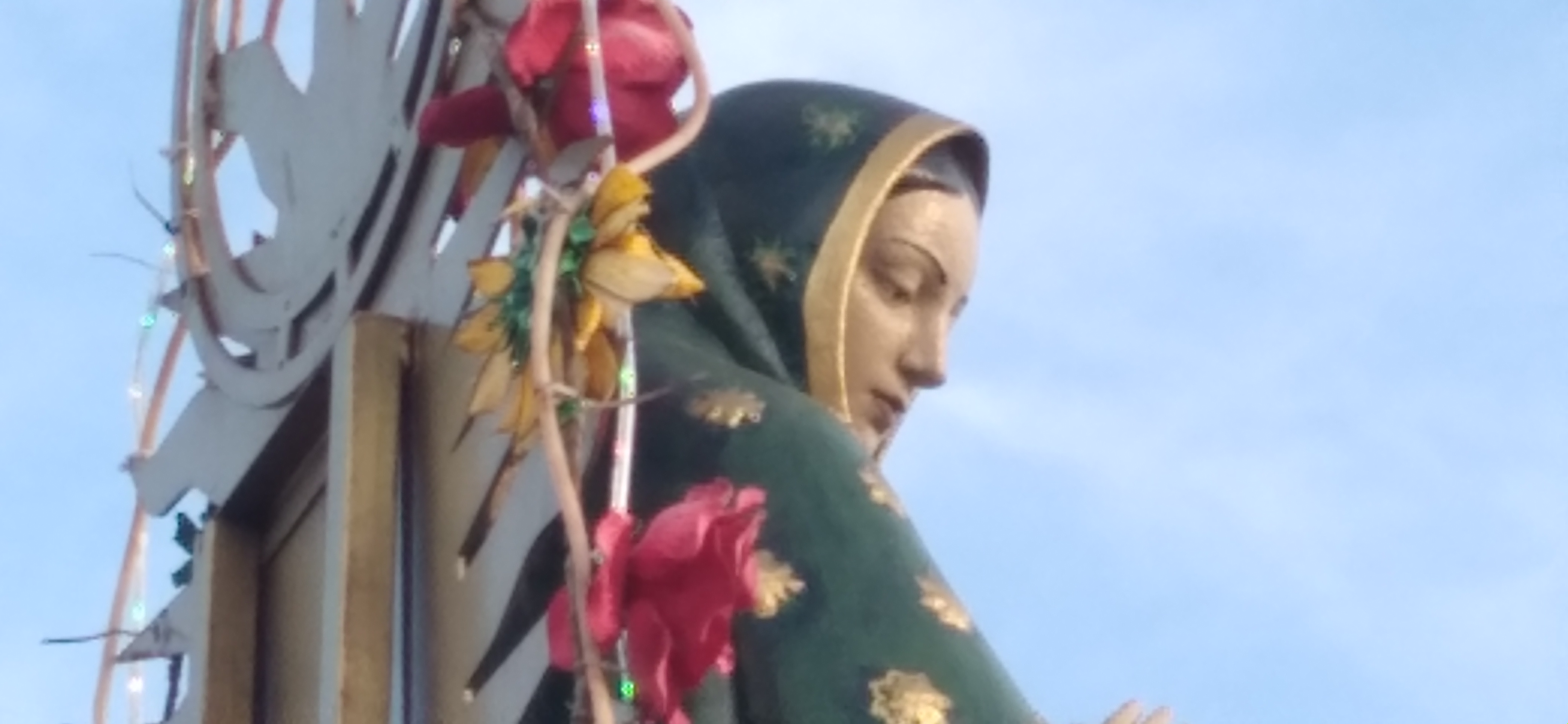
Close view

Catholic mass
