= Tehuacán =

Tehuacan, Puebla
- City and municipality
- Tehuacán
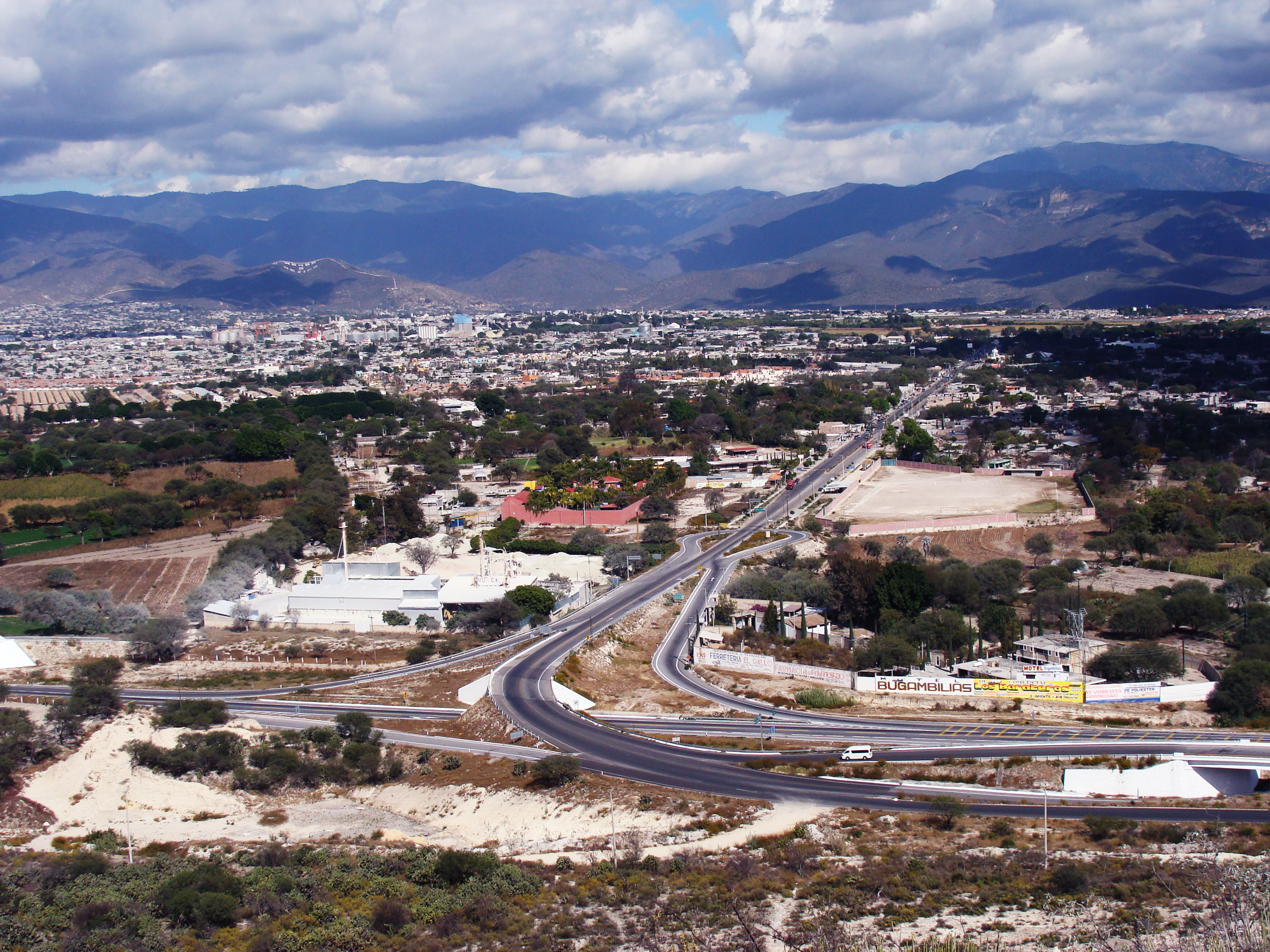

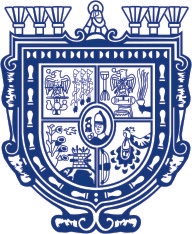
- Coat of arms
- Nickname: The Place of Gods
- Motto: Spanish: Por la Fe y la Esperanza "By faith and hope"
- State of Puebla within Mexico

- Location within Mexico
- Coordinates: 18°27′42″N 97°23′34″W
- Country: Mexico
- State: Puebla
- Founded: 15th century
- Erected: March 16, 1660

Government
  - Mayor: Andrés Artemio Caballero López

Area
  - Municipality: 553.57 km^{2} (213.73 sq mi)
  - Urban: 27.83 km^{2} (10.75 sq mi)
- Elevation: 1,600 m (5,200 ft)

Population (2022)
  - Municipality: 357,621
- Time zone: UTC-6 (Central (US Central))
- Postal code (of seat): 75710
- Area code: 238
- Demonym: Tehuacanero
- Website: www.tehuacan.gob.mx (in Spanish)

Tehuacán (Spanish pronunciation: [tewaˈkan]) is the second largest city in the Mexican state of Puebla, nestled in the southeast of the valley of Tehuacán, bordering the states of Oaxaca and Veracruz. The 2010 census reported a population of 248,716 in the city and 274,906 in the surrounding Tehuacán municipality, making it the most populated city outside of the state capital, Puebla de Zaragoza. The municipality has an area of 390.36 km^{2} (150.72 sq mi). and the city serves as its municipal seat.

The name Tehuacán is derived from the Classical Nahuatl language, from teōtl ('god') + -can (suffix used to indicate the location of something). Therefore, it means "place of the gods".

== History ==
Originally a Nahua settlement, it surrendered to Hernán Cortés in 1520. Tehuacán became officially a city in the Viceroyalty of New Spain in 1660.

== Culture ==
Tehuacán is known for hosting many diverse festivals that celebrate traditions and costumes earned through the years from the ancient natives. One of the most recognized festival in the last 15 years is the Festival Internacional de Tehuacán 1660 which celebrates the artistic and cultural backgrounds of the city.

In the late nineteenth century, the city was well known for its mineral springs. In fact, Peñafiel (now owned by Keurig Dr Pepper), a well-known soft drinks manufacturer, extracts water from these wells for use in their products. Tehuacán also has an important cluster of poultry producers, making the city and its surroundings one of the most important egg-producing regions in Mexico.

== Economy ==
The main economic activity in the Tehuacán valley is poultry production. The municipality is the second largest producer of table eggs in the country with over 25 million layers housed plus a significant production of broilers for chicken meat. Companies that dominate the industry include El Calvario, Mr. Egg, Huevo Tehuacán, PATSA and IMSA.

After the NAFTA agreement had been signed, Tehuacán saw a flood of textile maquiladoras established in the city and surrounding areas. These textile factories principally put together blue jeans for export to companies such as The Gap, Guess, Old Navy, and JC Penney. At the height of the maquila (short for maquiladora) boom, there were an estimated number of more than 700 maquilas in town, including those that were operating from homes, often in secret. While this situation created a negative unemployment (zero unemployment) and the maquilas sought workers as far away as Orizaba and Córdoba in the neighboring state of Veracruz, it also created an urban and environmental nightmare. In one decade, Tehuacán went from being a town of 150,000 inhabitants to a city of 360,000. Although many maquilas have closed today, in 2007 there were still over 700 of them found in Tehuacán.

== Geography ==
Tehuacán is located in the southeastern part of Mexico. Northern bordering cities are Tepanco de López, Santiago Miahuatlán, Vicente Guerrero y Nicolás Bravo; Eastern Vicente Guerrero, San Antonio Cañada y Ajalpan; Southern San Gabriel Chilac, Zapotitlán, San Antonio Texcala y Altepexi; and Western Zapotitlán, San Martín Atexcal, Juan N. Méndez y Tepanco de López.

The city of Tehuacán has a population of 248,716 with a geographical weather of 19 degrees Celsius most of the year. Tehuacan is an important territory known as the Tehuacán Valley with a diverse ecosystem.

Another important geographical factor to consider about the region of Oaxaca and Tehuacán valley is the telluric area where the city is located. Tehuacán is surrounded by the Neovolcanic Axis that covers the states of Nayarit, Jalisco, Colima, Michoacán, Guanajuato, Querétaro, Mexico, Hidalgo, Morelos, Tlaxcala, Puebla and Veracruz. This Axis connects the main active volcanoes of the region and because of this volcanic activity the city presents continuous movements of Earth, specially during summer and spring seasons.

Tehuacan Valley presents a high diversity of plant and animal species, especially the Tehuacán-Cuicatlán Biosphere Reserve located 30 minutes southwest from Tehuacán, that belongs to the city and protects 200 cactus species, most of them endangered types.

== Tourism ==
Tehuacan offers a diversity of attractions, from outside activities to historical places and museums that keep years of history not just from the region but from ancient times and establishment of the Mexican Republic.

The most popular places to visit are:

Peñafiel and Garci Crespo Natural Springs Underground galleries that are the production facilities for the famous mineral water known as "Agua Tehuacan". This is part of a natural process as a result of snow melting from the volcanoes which contain a high level of minerals, making it bubbly.

The Ex-Convent of San Francisco is a 16th-century monastic complex that was used as the house of one of the most renowned schools of Latin in the New Spain. The architecture and history printed on its walls painting shows the transition from one period of history to another.

The Museum of Mineralogy is a museum that has a private collection from Don Miguel Romero, one of the most recognized figures from Tehuacan city that donated important art and scientific pieces such as moonstones, fossil minerals and meteorites given as presents and others found in the Tehuacan Valley region during diverse explorations through the times.

The Cactus Botanical Garden is located 30 minutes away from the city at the south area of the Tehuacan Valley and it preserves more than 200 cactus species in all the area, making it the biggest diversity ecosystem around the world.

=== Religion ===
Catholicism is the most predominant religion in Tehuacán. On September 1, 1962, The Diocese of Tehuacán was created, whose headquarters is the Cathedral of Tehuacán, which is dedicated to "The Lady of the Immaculate Conception and Cave". The Diocese of Tehuacán is located in the southeast of the State of Puebla, an area of 6294 km^{2} with a population of 1,008,621 inhabitants, of which 928,317 inhabitants, are catholic.

In Tehuacán there are also important Christian groups of evangelicals and Jehovah's Witnesses, in addition to other Protestant sects. There is also a minority of Messianic Jews, although to a lesser degree there are groups that declare themselves not practicing any religion.

== Archaeology ==
The transition from nomadic hunting and gathering to a settled, agricultural way of life in Tehuacan valley has been the subject of extensive study.

The valley was home to the Tehuacán culture (5000 BCE–2300 BCE).

Archaeologist Richard MacNeish with his collaborators conducted a large-scale reconnaissance and excavation project in Tehuacán that was carried out between 1960 and 1965. MacNeish and his team tested 15 caves, then concentrated on 6 named El Riego, Tecorral, San Marcos, Purrón, Abejas, and Coxcatlán.

The results were published in a five volume edited series, and attracted much attention.

"MacNeish found that a Late Archaic complex of stone bowls was followed by Mexico's first pottery. Named for Purrón Cave, where they first appeared, these monochrome Mexican ceramics resembled (and briefly coexisted with) the stone bowls."

=== Maize domestication ===
Historically, the Valley of Tehuacán is important to the whole of Mexico, as the most ancient forms of cultivated maize known were found here by archeologists.

According to the MacNeish (MacNeish, 1981, 1985), the Valley of Tehuacán was the first place maize was ever cultivated by humankind. He arrived at this conclusion when he found over 10,000 teosinte cobs in what is now known as the Coxcatlan Cave. What he found were actually halfway between maize and teosinte—corncobs the size of a cigarette filter.

Later, in 1989, his work was re-evaluated and confirmed. Zea mays samples from Cueva San Marcos and from Cueva Coxcatlan in Tehuacan neighborhood had been tested. The oldest dates were 4700 BP (uncalibrated) or 3600 BC (calibrated).

These sites are located in the Balsas River valley, which continues downstream into the state of Guerrero. There are also very early maize sites there, which more recently attracted attention.

More recent evidence supports Balsas River valley as the first place in the world where maize was first domesticated about 9000 years ago.

The so-called "Balsas teosinte", now considered to be the direct predecessor of maize, grows mostly in the middle part of the Balsas valley at this time. In the past, it may have grown in other parts of this valley, depending on palaeoclimatology studies.

The recent debate among scientists was where exactly in the Balsas River valley this type of teosinte (Zea mays ssp. parviglumis) grew.

== Notable people ==
- Juan Rafael Méndez, professional footballer
- Agnés Torres Hernández, psychologist, researcher, and transgender activist, born in Tehuacán

== See also ==
- El Riego phase
- Abejas Phase
- Tehuacán Valley matorral — Deserts and xeric shrublands ecoregion in the Valley.
