= Dogs in Mesoamerica =

Dogs in Mesoamerica of various sorts are known to have existed in prehispanic times as shown by archaeological and iconographical sources, and the testimonies of the 16th-century Spaniards. In the Central Mexican area, there were three breeds: the medium-sized furred dog (itzcuintli), the medium-sized hairless dog (xoloitzcuintli), and the short-legged (tlalchichi) based in Colima and now extinct. Apart from other, more obvious functions, dogs were also used for food (10% of all consumed meat in Teotihuacan) and ritual sacrifice.

== Maya used domesticated dogs ==
The ancient Maya, a group of people who lived throughout southern Mexico and Central America, used domesticated dogs on a daily basis as a food source, hunting aide, and an element in religious and spiritual rituals.

== Archaeological evidence ==
Remains of dogs have been found in sites dating from the Preclassic through the Postclassic periods of Mesoamerica dating as early as 1200 BCE. These remains have appeared in middens, spread over yard surfaces, and near areas of sacrificial offerings. Since the deposits of dogs were discovered along with other plant and animal remains, it is difficult to decipher dog parts from those of other small mammals. In Colha, Belize, dog foot bones and teeth were found more than any other body part.

== Uses of dogs ==
Despite the fact that the amount of dog use varied throughout time and place, people of the coastal regions of the Maya area placed more importance on dogs due to their constant availability as a source of protein and their ability to rapidly reproduce. Breeding and raising domesticated dogs required low energy use. Fish and other hunted animals were not as reliable as dogs as a food resource, and it required more energy and time to capture these animals for consumption. Overall, it is because of the comparison of dog deposits to other fauna and how the amount of dog deposits differs among sites from various periods. Because of this variation, it is not certain if the function of dogs altered from a food source to that of a religious symbol over time. Besides becoming a meal, dogs were also used as hunting and traveling companions and were scavengers in the home.

=== Dog nutrition ===
In addition to eating maize, dogs ate household scraps. Dog remains found in the Teotihuacan Valley offer evidence of specialized diets, especially of dogs that were associated with ritual activities. Some had diets with high meat content but with wolf/dog hybrids, some had a diet almost completely based on vegetables. Today, the Yucatec Maya continue to talk about their dog-eating ancestors and carry on the tradition of feeding dogs maize by giving them six to eight tortillas daily.

=== Breeds of dog ===
Contemporary Maya have nine words for "dog" in their lexicon, not all of which correspond to separate breeds. It was documented in the sixteenth century by Spanish explorers in Mérida, Yucatán that dogs were bred locally in pens, fed maize, and sold at market. Another type of dog recognized by Maya was the hairless xoloitzcuintli, however, breeds are difficult to recognize archaeologically.

== Dogs in Maya culture and religion ==
=== Dogs in Maya literature ===
In the Popol Vuh, the K'iche' Maya creation story, dogs played important roles in certain events. For example, the second attempt at creating humans turned disastrous when the gods made them out of wood. The wooden humans were emotionless and would not feed the dogs. In retaliation, the dogs became angry and destroyed them. The moral of the story is "civilized" Maya make certain that dogs are fed on a decent human diet such as maize. When dogs were used in ritual sacrifices, the act contained a dual meaning: a person gave respect to the dog by feeding it maize, which represent humans. Humans were made of maize by the gods in the Popol Vuh.

Another account in the Popol Vuh describes the Hero twins sacrificing a dog that belonged to the Lords of the Underworld, also known as Xibalba. After the dog was dead, the Hero Twins brought it back to life. The Lords were so impressed that they asked the twins to sacrifice and resurrect them. In the end, the Hero Twins sacrificed the Lords of Xibalba and did not follow through on bringing them back to life. This made it possible for humans to live on earth. The story linked dogs with renewal and human life. Dogs are associated with death and have the job of leading people into the Underworld. They represent fire and are protectors of the hearth, two components of Maya life.

=== Dog sacrifice and burial ===
There are multiple situations in which dogs were used for sacrifice or burial. Dog sacrifices were important in the political sphere for rituals concerning “...inaugurations and founding of new civic religious centres...” There has also been confirmation of dog burials in Cozumel used in circumstances involving administration. Dogs were associated with “new beginnings" and were sacrificed instead of humans on the New Year ceremony.

Dogs with spots that looked like the color of cacao were sacrificed during cacao rituals because they represented economic significance. Landmarks linked to fertility and ancestor worship contain dog burials. Dogs were found buried alongside humans in graves as well as in royal residences, presumably to guide their owners to the afterlife.

=== Dogs in Maya art ===
In Maya art, dogs are represented in various roles and media. They have been depicted in scenes such as those from the Popol Vuh or burial processions. The Maya Vase Database exhibits an example of a possible funeral procession on a painted vase, K5534. The dog standing below the head noble's palanquin may be guiding its owner to Xibalba. In picture K555, another vase painting shows a scene from the Popol Vuh with Dog asking Itzamná to return to Xibalba. In addition to paintings, artists created clay figurines to resemble dogs, K8235.

== See also ==
- Abejas Phase
- Native American dogs

== Bibliography ==
- Beyer, Herman (1908). "The Symbolic Meaning of the Dog in Ancient Mexico". American Anthropologist. 10 (3): 419–422. doi:10.1525/aa.1908.10.3.02a00050. ISSN 1548-1433.
- Clutton-Brock, Juliet; et al. (1994). "Hot dogs: Comestible Canids in Preclassic Maya Culture at Cuello, Belize". Journal of Archaeological Science. 21 (6): 819–826. doi:10.1006/jasc.1994.1079. ISSN 0305-4403.
- Kerr, Justin (October 2001). "The Last Journey, Reflections on the Ratinlinxul Vase and others of the same theme". mayavase.com.
- Masson, Marilyn A. (1999). "Animal resource manipulation in ritual and domestic contexts at Postclassic Maya communities". World Archaeology. 31 (1). Routledge: 93–120. doi:10.1080/00438243.1999.9980434. ISSN 0043-8243.
- Sharpe, Ashley E.; et al. (2022). "Dogs for the Gods, Fish for the Feast: The Ceremonial Role of Animals at Kaminaljuyu, Guatemala". Latin American Antiquity. 33 (2). Cambridge University Press: 221–241. doi:10.1017/laq.2021.81. ISSN 1045-6635. JSTOR 27362414.
- White, Christine D.; et al. (2001). "Isotopic Evidence for Maya Patterns of Deer and Dog Use at Preclassic Colha". Journal of Archaeological Science. 28 (1): 89–107. doi:10.1006/jasc.1999.0560. ISSN 0305-4403.
