= Juan Rafael Méndez =

Mexican footballer (born 1985)

Personal information
- Full name: Juan Rafael Méndez Zúñiga
- Date of birth: September 5, 1985 (age 41)
- Place of birth: Tehuacán, Puebla, Mexico
- Height: 1.69 m (5 ft 6 1/2 in)
- Position: Defender

Team information
- Current team: La Piedad
- Number: 29

Senior career*
Years	Team	Apps	(Gls)
2007–2008	Petroleros Salamanca	1	(0)
2009–	La Piedad	6	(1)
- * Club domestic league appearances and goals as of September 27, 2009

Juan Rafael Méndez Zúñiga (born 5 September 1985) is a Mexican footballer, who plays as defender for La Piedad in Mexico.

Méndez made his professional debut for Petroleros de Salamanca on November 25, 2007, against Indios de Ciudad Juárez (when they were still in the Primera A). Indios won that affair, 2–1.

For the Apertura 2009, when Salamanca was dissolved and relocated to La Piedad, Méndez left as well.
