= Abejas Phase =

Fourth phase of the Tehuacán Valley of Mexico

The Abejas Phase, also known as the Late Archaic, is the fourth phase of the Tehuacán Valley of Mexico sequence, dating from 3825 to 2600 BC. Although the Tehuacán Valley sequence of phases has become one of the most famous phase sequences for any region in Mesoamerica, very few sites from these phases are known.

== Description ==
Following the Ajuereado, El Riego, and the Coxcatlan phase, and followed by the Purron and Ajalpan phases, Abejas is the fourth of six phases. The Abejas phase population may have been twice as large as its preceding phase, Coxcatlan. This period is marked by the appearance of campsites and permanent settlements installed on river terraces, a noticeable decline in reliance on wild foods, domestication of plants (maize, beans, squash), and the appearance of long obsidian blades During this phase, agriculture supplies 25% of food requirements. Also during this phase, new material culture innovation arose such as split-stitch basketry, stone bowls and jars.

== Sites ==
Sites associated with the Abejas phase include: Coxcatlan Cave, San Marcos Cave (Tehuacan), Abejas Cave, Purron Cave and an area near Chilac. However, Cueva Blanca is the only excavated site assigned to this time period.

== Other information ==
Although the evidence of dogs in mesoamerica dates back to Paleoindian times, the oldest remains of domesticated dogs in Middle America are from about 5,000 years ago – from the Abejas phase.
