= Pendejo Cave =

Geological feature and archaeological site

Coordinates: 32°25′N 105°55′W

Pendejo Cave is a geological feature and archaeological site located in southern New Mexico about 20 miles east of Orogrande. Archaeologist Richard S. MacNeish claimed that human occupation of the cave pre-dates by tens of thousands of years the Clovis Culture, traditionally believed to be one of the oldest if not the oldest culture in the Americas. Pendejo Cave is located about 50 miles (80 km) south-east of the White Sands footprints which are claimed to predate the Clovis Culture by about 10,000 years.

== Description ==
Pendejo is a relatively small cave, only 5 meters wide, 12 meters deep, and having a maximum height of 3 meters. It is below the rim of an escarpment, facing north, and about 50 metres (160 ft) above the canyon floor. The cave is located at an elevation of 1,490 metres (4,890 ft) amidst the sparse desert vegetation of the Chihuahua Desert. A slightly more mesic habitat is found at the foot of the cliffs.

Pendejo is a Spanish word and literally means "a pubic hair", but in Mexico it can also be a vulgar insult to someone's intelligence.

== Archaeological history ==
Pendejo Cave was discovered in 1978, and twelve years later, in early 1990, the first archaeological expedition headed by MacNeish excavated the site. Another excavation occurred one year later, in late winter and early spring of 1991. Clovis (c. 11,000 BCE) tools were found in the cave, along with tools from later Native societies. Unifacial shavers, utilized flakes, and other artifacts were uncovered and attributed to various eras, along with several examples of worked bone, including a bone awl made from the scapula of a horse, and a knife made from a rib bone.

MacNeish claimed to have found even earlier Native American artifacts in the cave. A total of 111 chipped tools was found throughout the formation in three complexes. He estimated the oldest may date back as far as 75,000 years.

According to MacNeish, he found 3 pre-Clovis strata in the cave that he named, from oldest to youngest, the Orogrande, the McGregor, and the North Mesa.

As of 2004, the early dating of the discoveries at Pendejo Cave has been discounted by many archaeologists. Faunal remains in the cave had been dated to possibly as old as 55,000 years, but the manufacture and dating of the chipped stones and other alleged artifacts of human origin was disputed.

In 2005, William Farrand, in his review of MacNeish and Libby's 2004 book, noted the abundance and integrity of the data as provided by the authors. According to Farrand, "it is difficult to avoid accepting the hypothesis of pre-Clovis Paleoamericans in the American Southwest prior to 37,000 or 55,000 B.P."

== See also ==
- Bluefish Caves
- Early human migrations
- History of Mesoamerica (Paleo-Indian)
- Origins of Paleoindians
- Pre-Columbian trans-oceanic contact
