= Agnés Torres Hernández =

Mexican activist

Agnes Torres
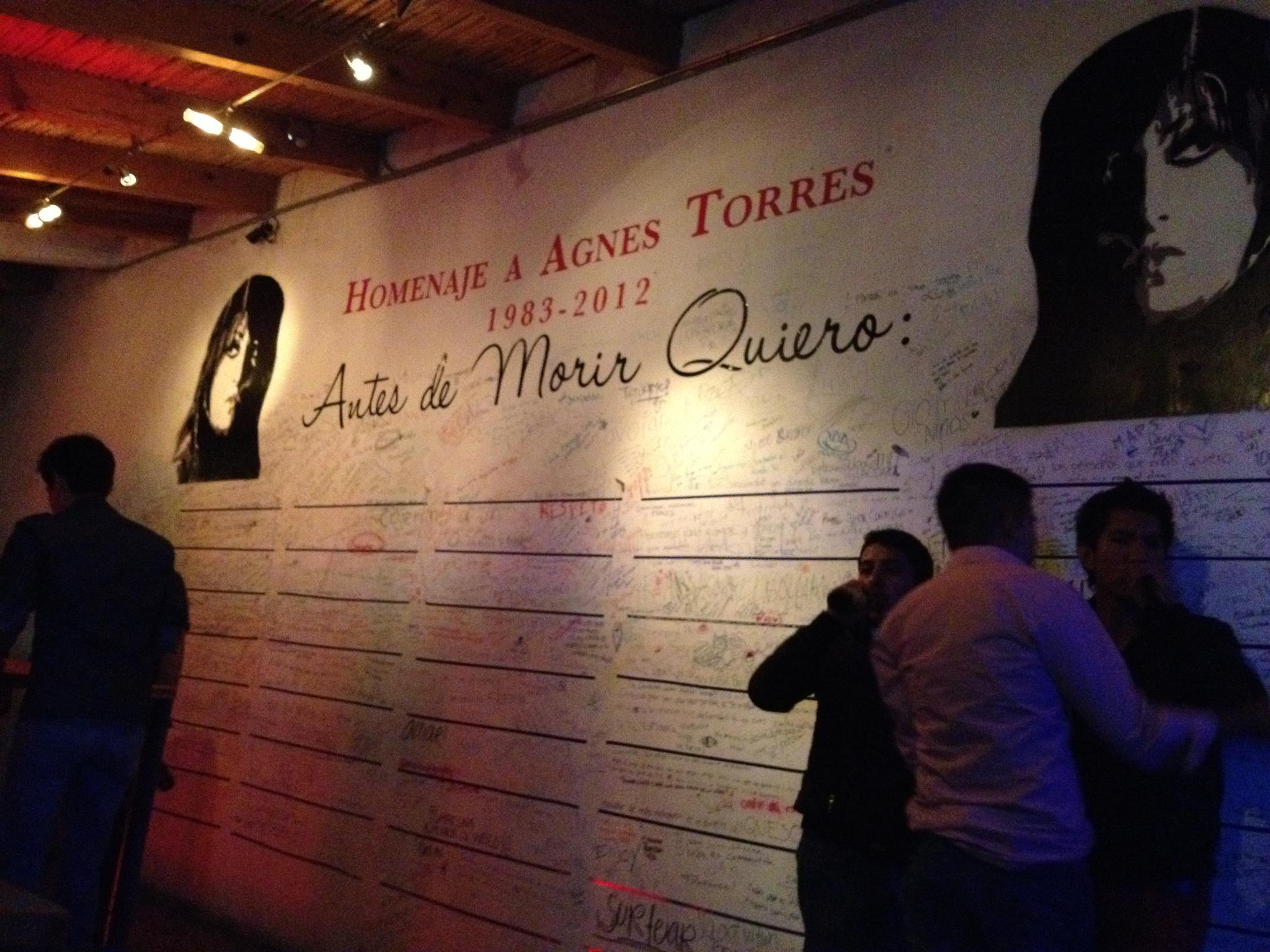
- Born: 1983; Tehuacán, Puebla, Mexico
- Died: 10 March 2012 (aged 28); Atlixco, Puebla, Mexico
- Education: Veracruz University
- Occupations: Psychologist, researcher, LGBT activist

Agnes Torres Hernández, or Agnés Torres (born 1983, Tehuacán – d. 10 March 2012, Atlixco) was a Mexican psychologist, researcher, and transgender activist.

Torres advocated for the legal recognition of transgender people in Mexico, and was murdered for her work on 10 March 2012. After her death, the Puebla state congress incorporated "hate crime" into the Civil Defense Code for crimes made on the basis of gender or sexual orientation.

== Education ==
Agnes Torres Hernández completed her psychology degree with honors in 2001 at Veracruz University. However, she was unable to actually receive her degree because it was issued under her deadname and not under the name Agnes.

In May 2014, Veracruz University issued Torres her degree post mortem in recognition of her social and activist work. Her mother received the degree on her behalf.

== Activism ==
Torres advocated for the right to rectify birth certificates and collaborated with Humana Nación Trans to seek respect and recognition for transgender persons at the national level. She also worked with the Democracy and Sexuality Network (DEMYSEX) and Erósfera.

In 2010, Torres filed a complaint against Javier López Zavala, then the PRI candidate for the governorship of Puebla, to the National Council to Prevent Discrimination over derogatory remarks López made in an electoral debate regarding transgender identity.

== Murder ==
According to reports from the Attorney General of the State of Puebla, Torres's body was found in a ravine Siglo XXI highway on 10 March 2012, showing signs of torture. Because of the violence evidently carried out upon her, Torres's murder was classified as a hate crime on the basis of transphobia.

Reports suggested that Torres's romantic partner killed her after learning she was transgender, with four others present. The Attorney General of Puebla arrested four suspects in connection to Torres's murder, while fifth remained a fugitive. Three years after her murder, in March 2015, no one had been charged for Torres's murder.
