= Techichi =

Extinct dog breed from Mesoamerica

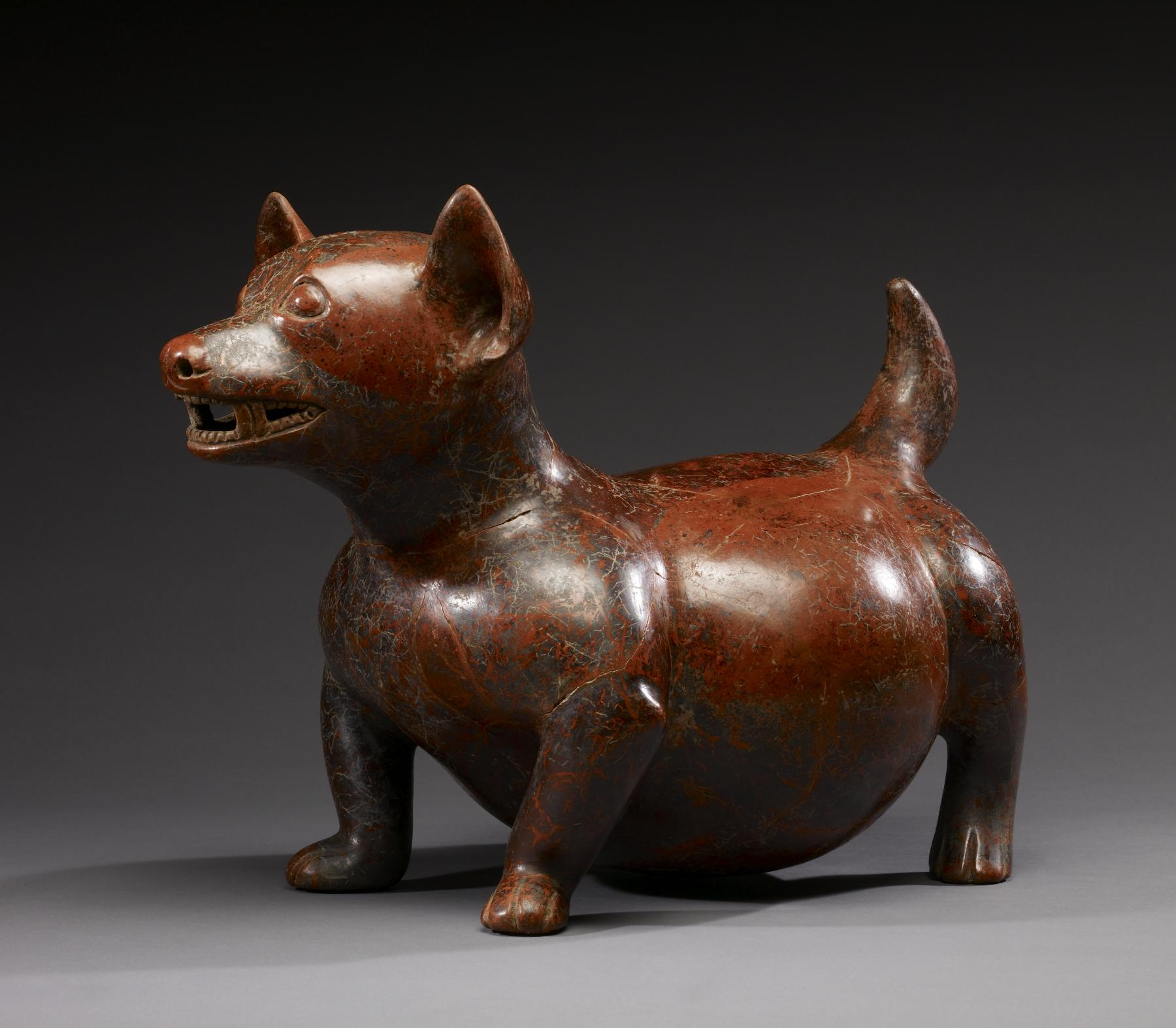
- Effigy of a Techichi dog from Colima, Mexico. Dated 100 BC-AD 300.
- Origin: Toltec civilization
- Breed status: Extinct

The Techichi is an extinct breed of small dog bred by the Toltec culture in the 9th century C.E. It is thought to be an ancestor of the modern Chihuahua.

== Description ==
Techichis varied in appearance, with their coats ranging from brown, brown and white, black and white, to black. Their ears were sometimes cropped close to the head, but their tails were left uncut in their natural state. Techichis were mute and could not bark.

== History ==
Techichis were larger than modern Chihuahuas, but were bred into the smaller, lighter dog known today by the Aztecs. The first European to encounter the dog breed was the Spanish explorer Francisco Hernandez, who reported its existence in 1578. He wrote that the native people ate them as commonly as they ate rabbits. The Spanish, who were often short of food, ate them on their expeditions as well. It is estimated that Spanish explorers ate as many as 100,000 Techichis, and by the 19th century they had disappeared altogether. It was not until the mid-1800s that people outside of Mexico took interest in the breed, finding many of its modern descendants in the Mexican state of Chihuahua, from which the modern breed derives its name.

== In human culture ==
To the Toltecs, Techichis were believed to have supernatural powers, such as seeing into the future, and they were often sacrificed so they could guide their owners in the afterlife. Like the Toltecs, the Aztecs also believed that Techichis could guide human souls after death, and that they could guard pyramids if buried underneath them. Several pre-Columbian artefacts have been discovered depicting the dogs, including wheeled toys and effigy pots. They were eaten as food by people, and certain stud males and brood females were kept to produce as many litters as possible.

== See also ==
- Dog meat
- Dogs in Mesoamerica
- List of extinct dog breeds
- Native American dogs
