= Rafael Barraza Sánchez =

Mexican priest (1928–2020)

His Excellency Rafael Barraza Sánchez
- Bishop of Mazatlán
- Native name: Rafael Barraza Sánchez
- Church: Catholic Church
- Diocese: Roman Catholic Diocese of Mazatlán
- See: Basilica Cathedral of Mazatlán
- In office: 1981-2005
- Predecessor: Miguel García Franco
- Successor: Mario Espinosa Contreras

Orders
- Ordination: 29 October 1951 by José María González y Valencia
- Consecration: 25 January 1980 by Antonio López Aviña

Personal details
- Born: 24 October 1928 Durango
- Died: 26 July 2020 (aged 91) Durango
- Coat of arms

Rafael Barraza Sánchez (24 October 1928 – 26 July 2020) was a Mexican Roman Catholic bishop. Barraza Sánchez was born in Durango and was ordained to the priesthood in 1951. He served as titular bishop of Drivastum and as auxiliary bishop of the Roman Catholic Archdiocese of Durango, Mexico, from 1979 to 1981 and then as bishop of the Roman Catholic Diocese of Mazatlán, Mexico, from 1981 to 2005.
