= Parroquia Cristo Rey, Mazatlán =

Church building in Mazatlán

Christ the King Parish
- Spanish: Parroquia Cristo Rey
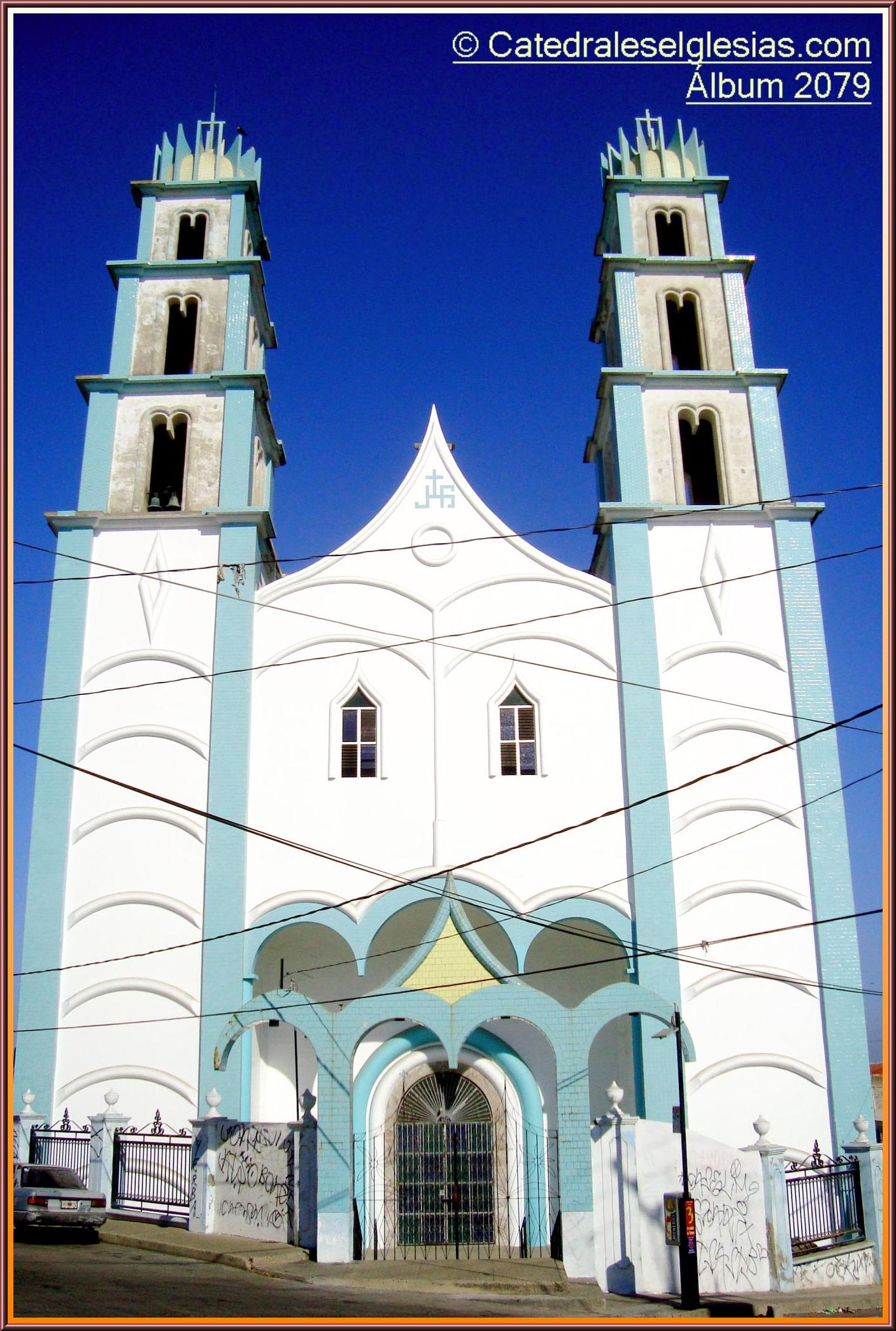
- Facade of the parish

Religion
- Affiliation: Catholic Church
- Rite: Latin Rite
- Patron: Christ the King
- Status: Active

Location
- Location: Mazatlán
- Municipality: Mazatlán Municipality
- State: Sinaloa
- Country: Mexico
- Interactive map of Christ the King Parish
- Coordinates: 23°12′30″N 106°24′59″W

Architecture
- Groundbreaking: Mid-20th century
- Completed: 1958

Specifications
- Dome: 2
- Spire: 2
- Temple: 1

The Parroquia Cristo Rey (Christ the King Parish) is a Catholic parish building in Mazatlán.

== History ==
It opened on February 22, 1958. The church has vivid stained glass windows, arched vaults and a bell tower more than 70 m (230 ft) high. Before the founding of the Mazatlán Diocesan Seminary in 1959, seminarians slept in the Cristo Rey Parish, ate at the Mazatlán Sanatorium, among other temporary places. For the seventh consecutive year, on December 21, 2021, tenor Jorge Echeagaray, musicians from the Camerata Mazatlán, singers from the Bellas Artes Opera Studio and the Ángela Peralta Choir participated in a Christmas concert in the parish. All the money raised from these events went towards the construction of the church.

== Gallery ==
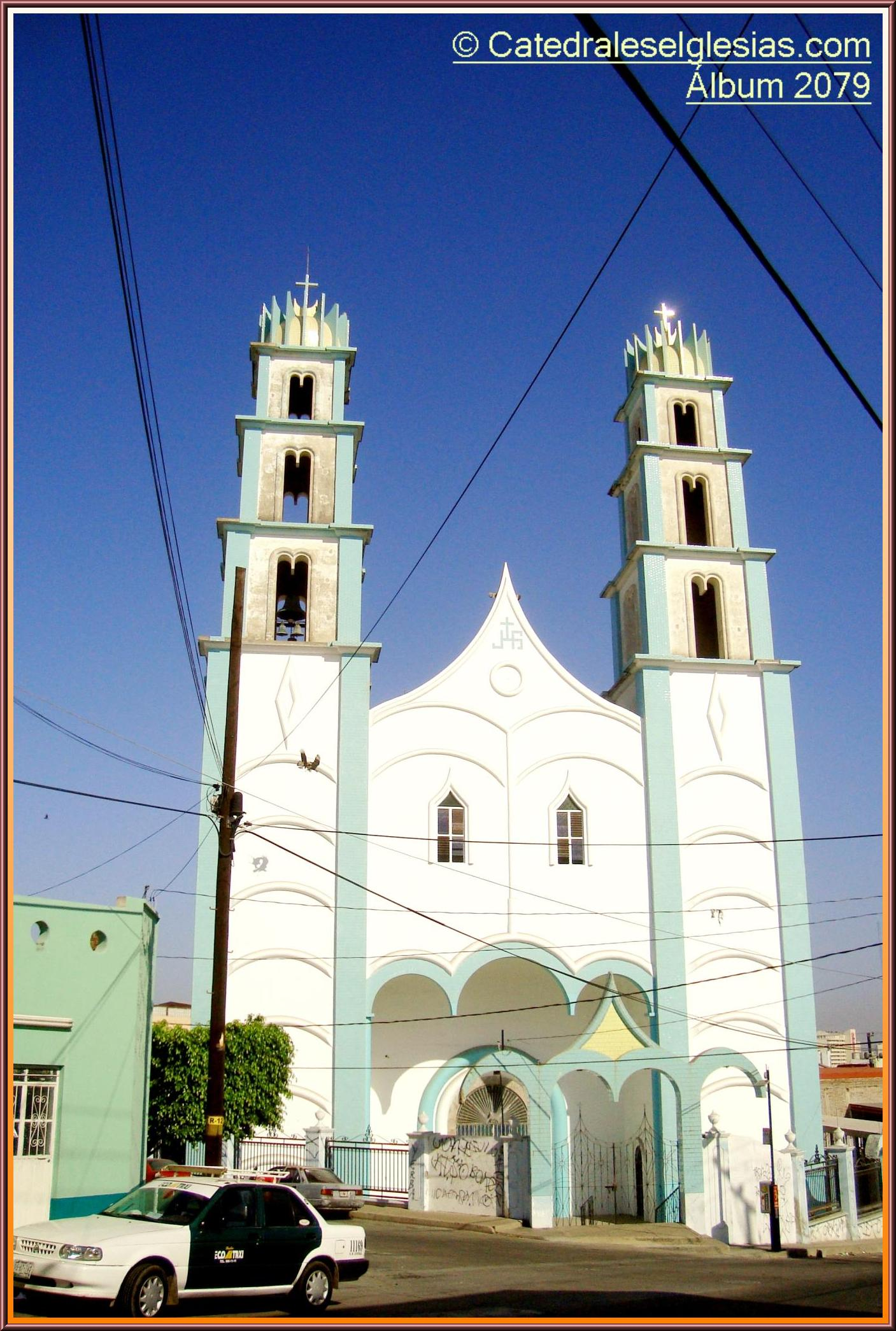
Parroquia Cristo Rey in 2011

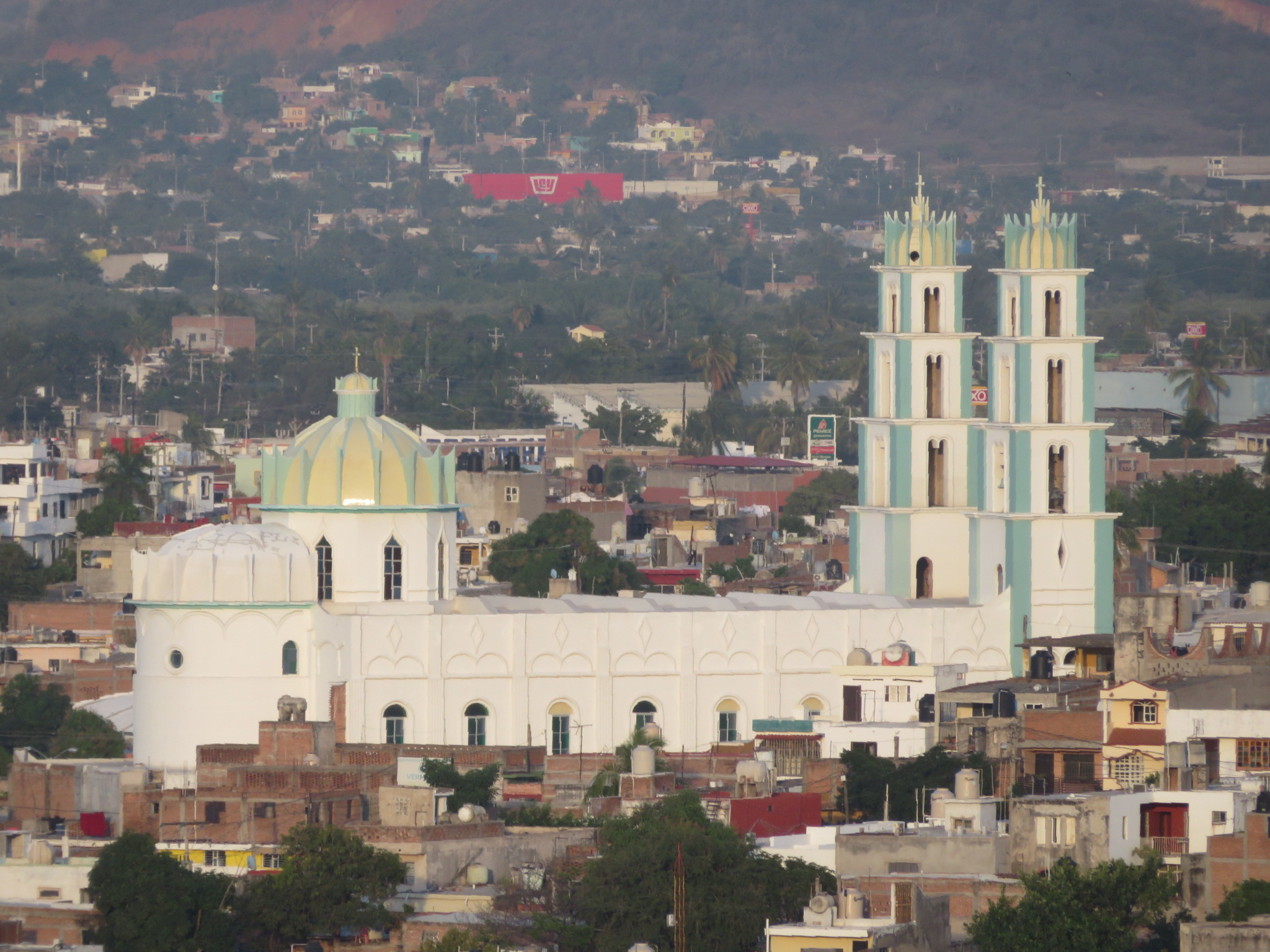
Parroquia Cristo Rey in 2017

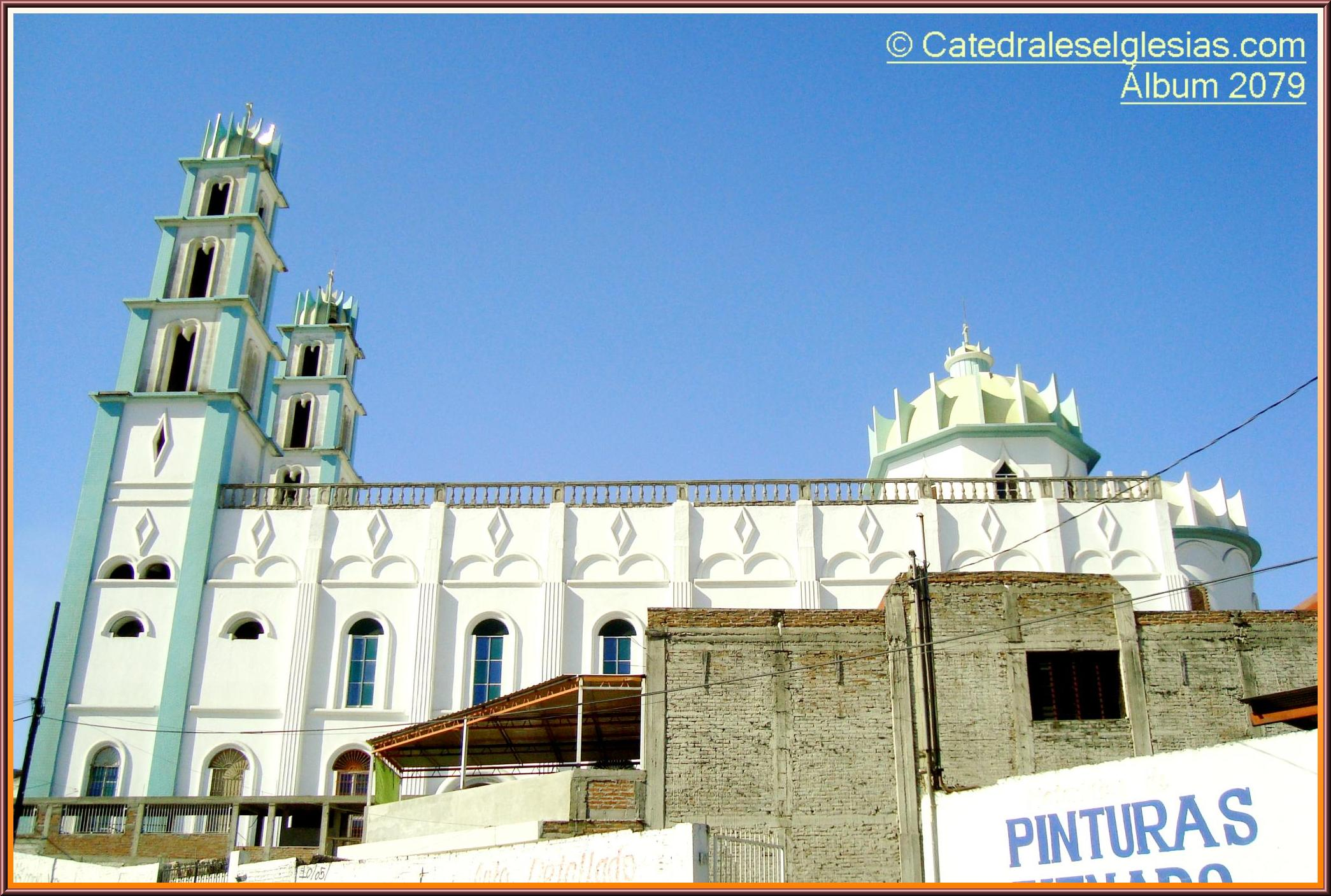
Side view

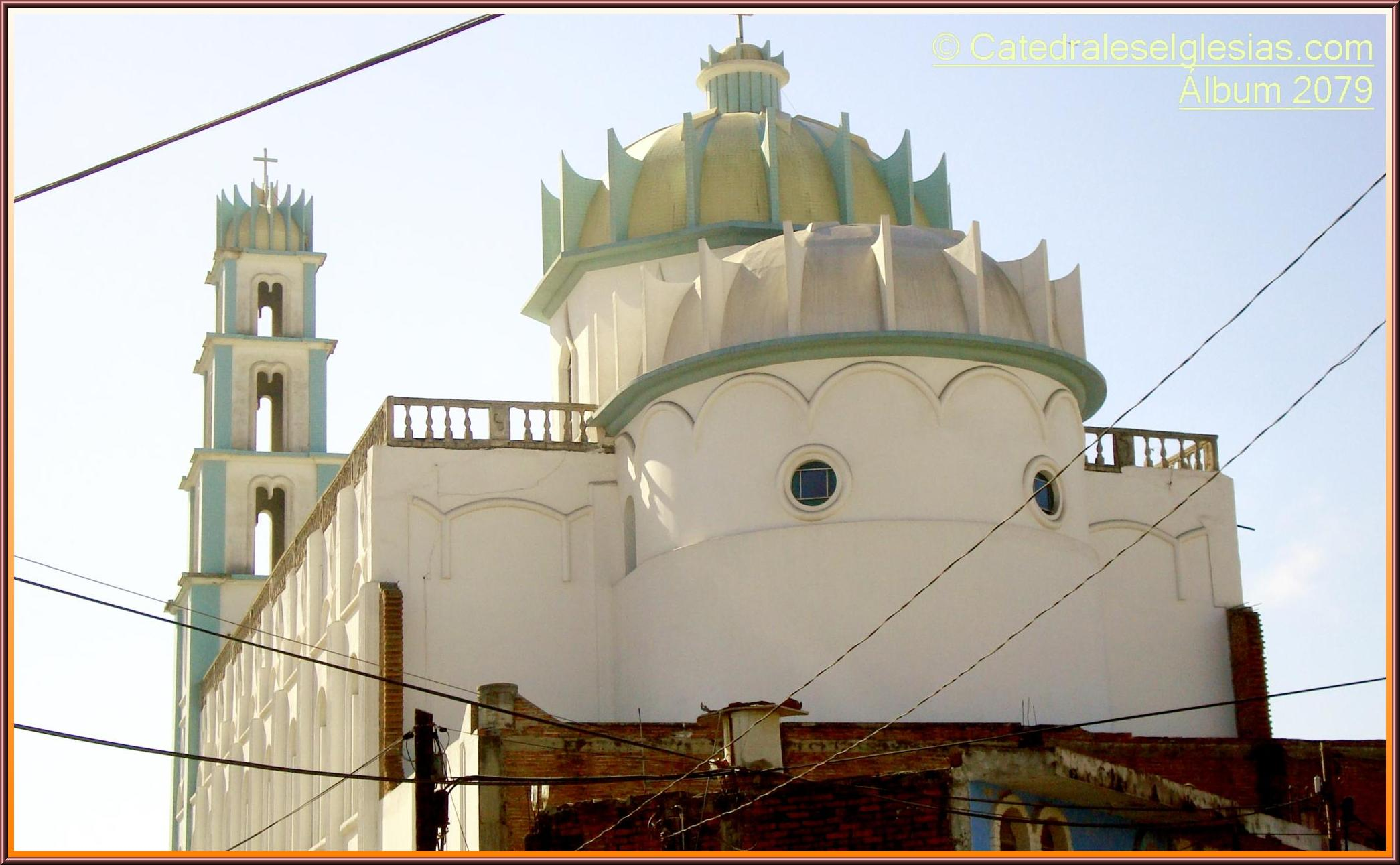
Back view with domes

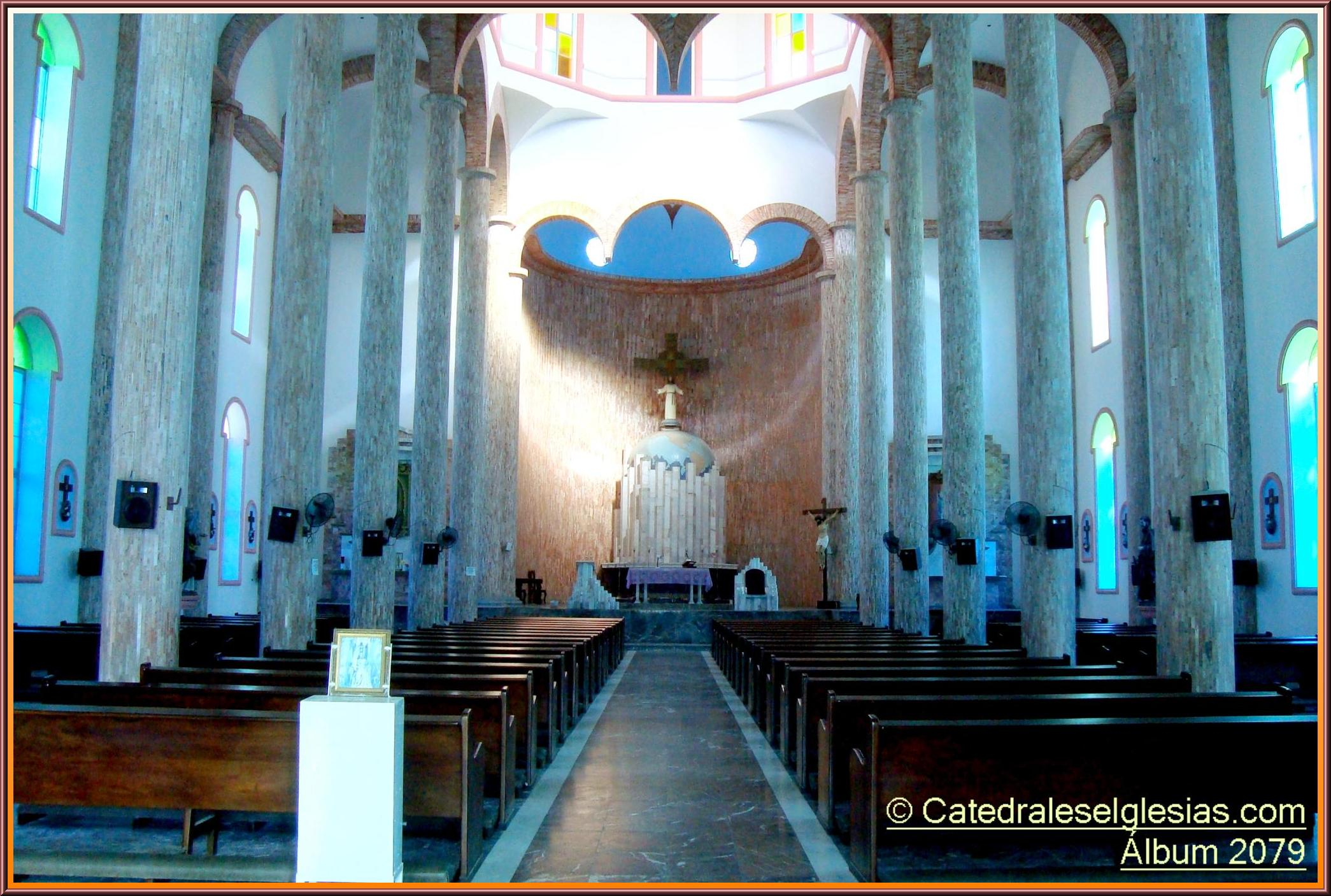
Interior of the parish
