= Miguel García Franco =

Mexican bishop

His Excellency Miguel García Franco
- Bishop of Mazatlán
- Church: Catholic Church
- Diocese: Roman Catholic Diocese of Mazatlán
- See: Basilica Cathedral of Mazatlán
- Appointed: 18 December 1958
- In office: 1959-1981
- Successor: Rafael Barraza Sánchez

Orders
- Ordination: 22 February 1959

Personal details
- Born: 16 March 1909 El Rincón Tepehuanes, Durango
- Died: 8 March 1981 (aged 71) Durango
- Coat of arms

Miguel García Franco (16 March 1909 - 8 March 1981) was a Mexican Roman Catholic bishop. At the age of 13 he entered the Conciliar Seminary of Durango. He was ordained priest in 1931. At the age of 16 he studied at the Pontifical Pius Latin College in Rome. He received his doctorate in Philosophy and Theology from the Pontifical Gregorian University in 1931. He served as bishop of the Roman Catholic Diocese of Mazatlán, Mexico, from 1959 to 1981.

He was in charge of the ecclesiastical jurisdiction that extended from Elota to Escuinapa. Approximately 35 thousand people received the bishop from the Mazatlán Airport, at that time it was located in the current facilities of the Autonomous University of Sinaloa, and followed him to the Cathedral. On February 22, 1959 he received the consecration in the Cathedral Basilica of Mazatlán. In that ceremony the Diocese of Mazatlán was formally established. He inaugurated the Diocesan Seminary later that same year. He died 8 days before his 72nd birthday on March 8, 1981 in his native Durango. His remains are buried inside the chapel of Guadalupe in the Cathedral Basilica of Mazatlán.

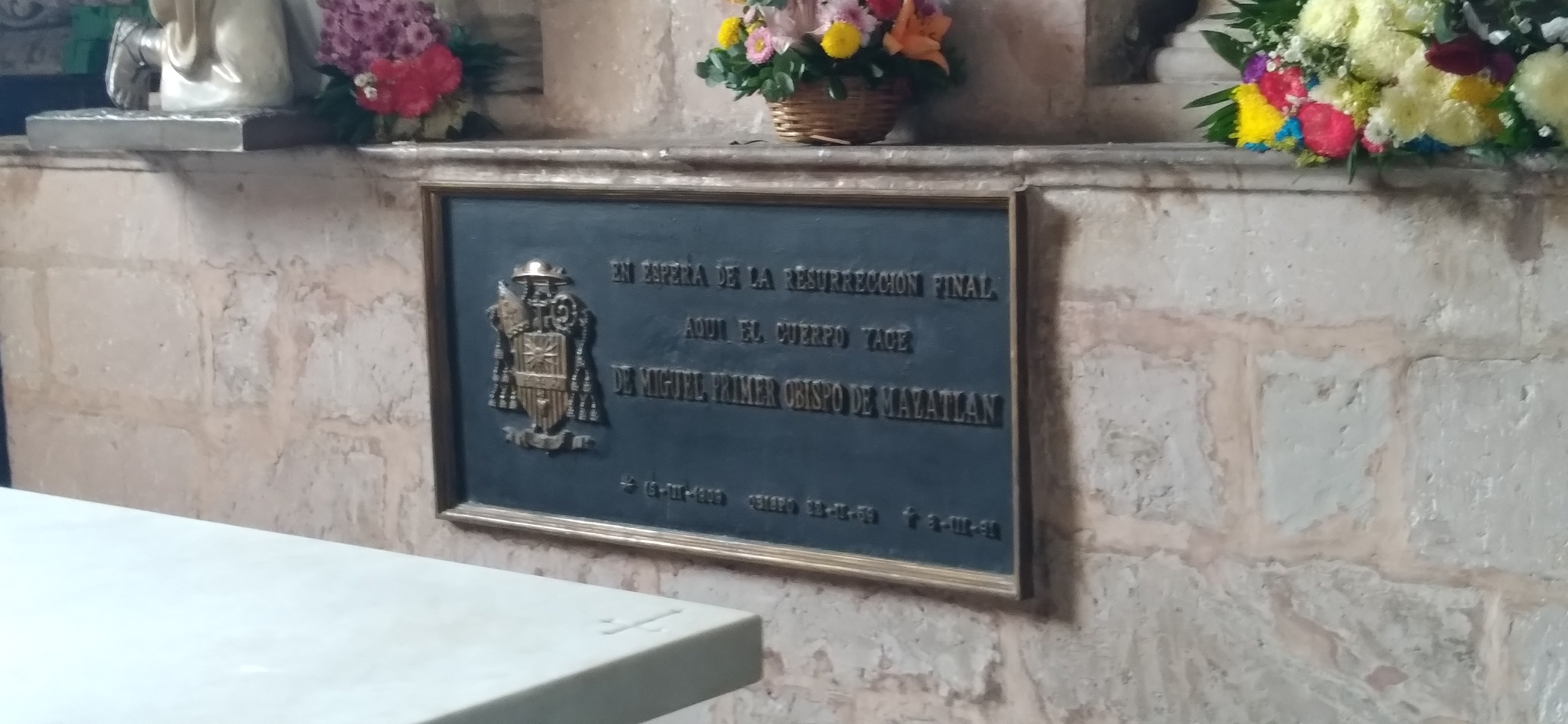
Tomb of Miguel García Franco

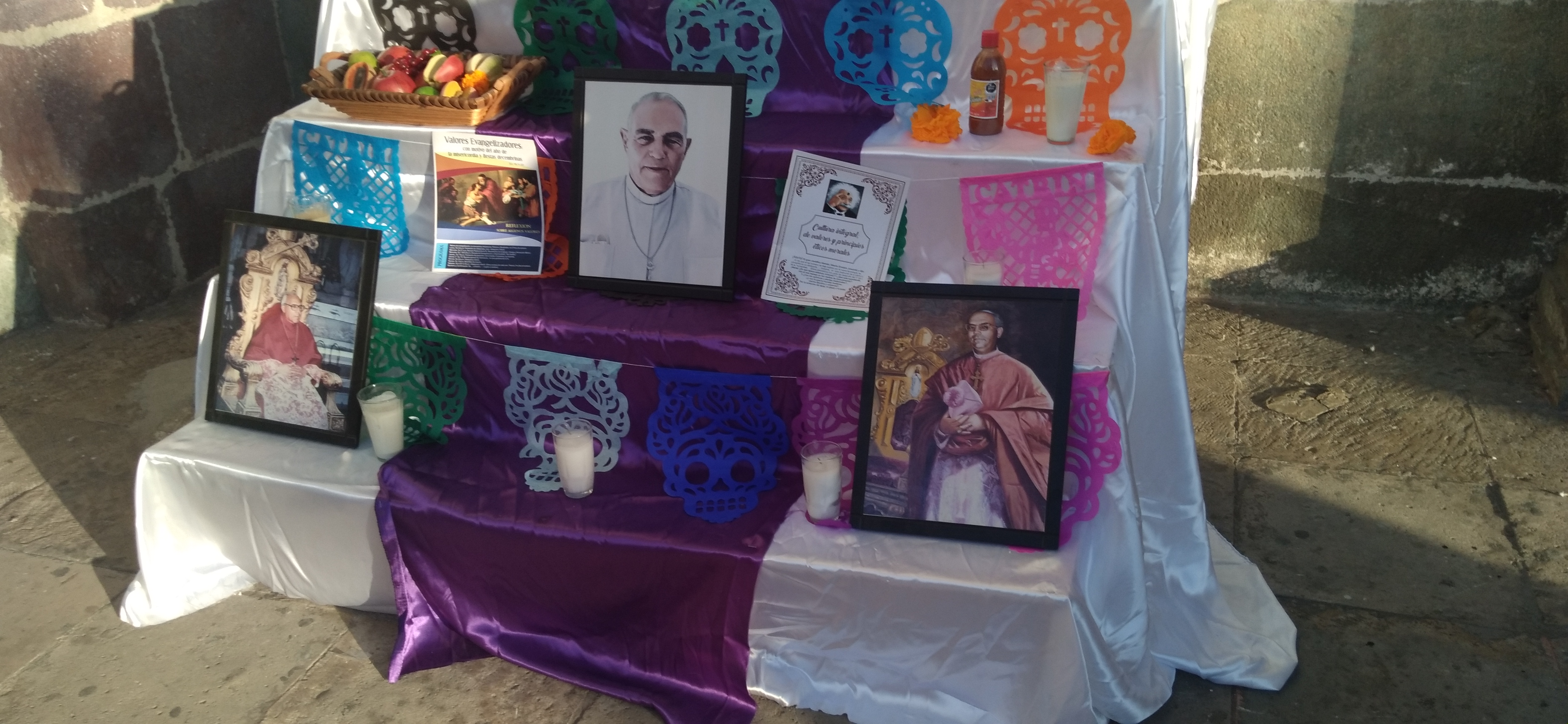
Altar of the Day of the Dead in the Cathedral of Mazatlán, the upper photo is of Monsignor José Trinidad Hernández Dávila and the lower portraits are of Bishop Miguel García Franco.
