= Templo de San José, Mazatlán =

Church building in Mazatlán

Temple of Saint Joseph
- Spanish: Templo de San José
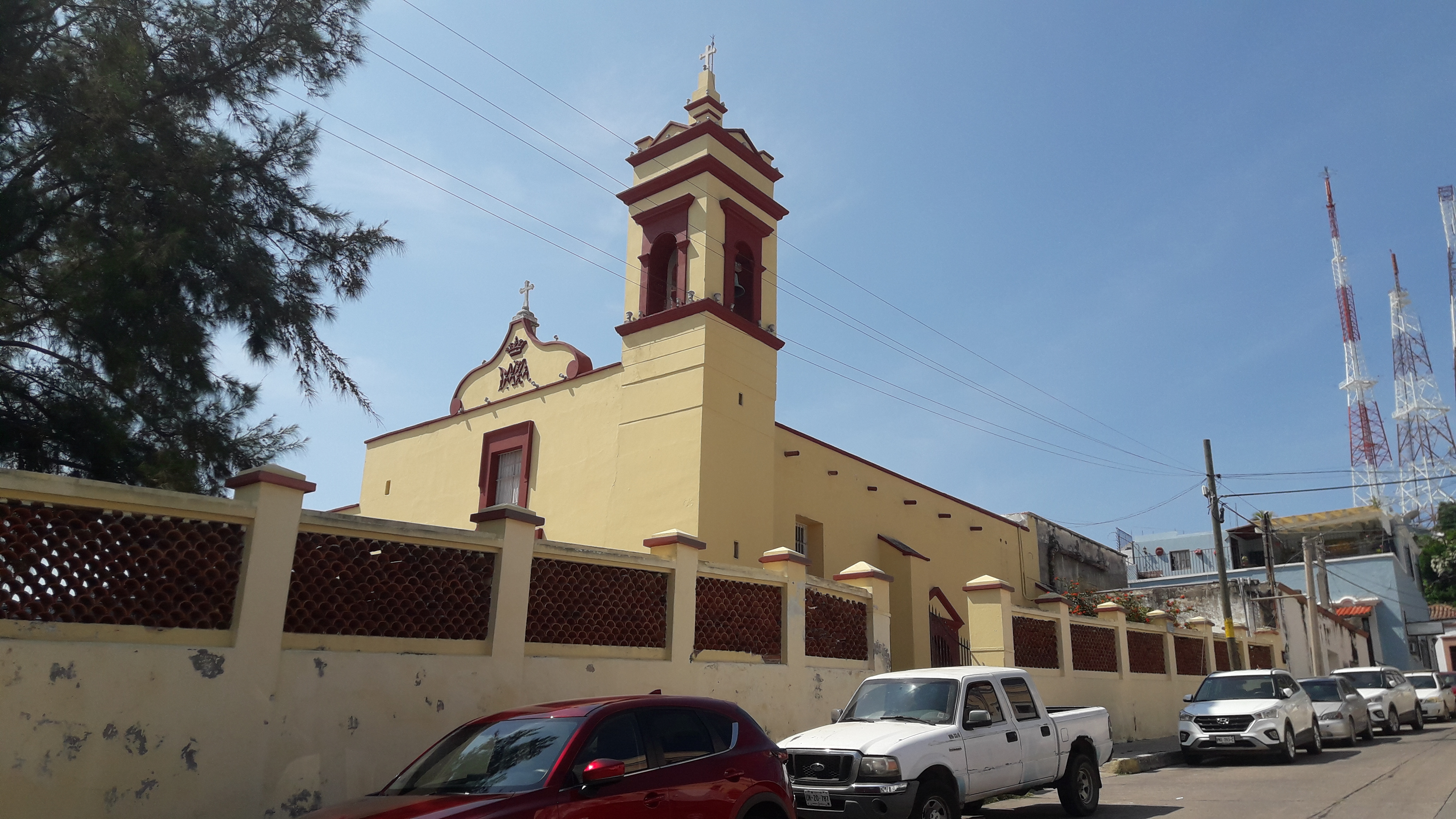
- Main exterior of the temple

Religion
- Affiliation: Catholic Church
- Rite: Latin Rite
- Patron: Saint Joseph
- Status: Active

Location
- Location: Mazatlán
- Municipality: Mazatlán Municipality
- State: Sinaloa
- Country: Mexico
- Interactive map of Temple of Saint Joseph
- Coordinates: 23°12′04″N 106°25′30″W

Architecture
- Founder: Discalced Carmelites
- Groundbreaking: Circa 1837
- Completed: 1842

Specifications
- Spire: 1
- Temple: 1

The Templo de San José (Temple of Saint Joseph) is a church building in Mazatlán, Mexico. It is the oldest religious building in the city, with construction dating back to the early 19th century.

The exact date of its construction is unknown, but historical records suggest it began in 1837 and took five years to complete. The temple preserves its original and characteristic features. The Discalced Carmelites were responsible for building the temple.

== History ==
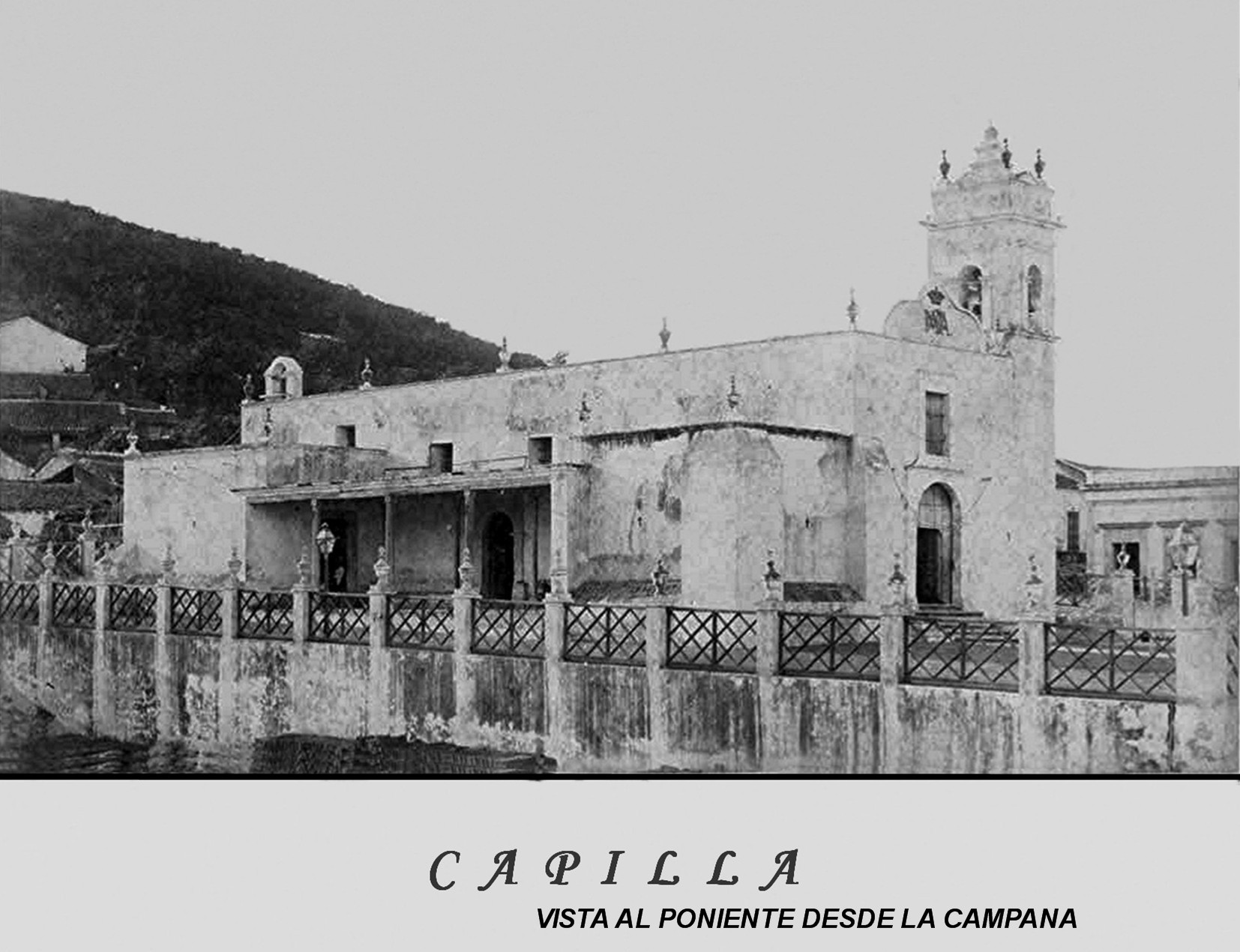
View of the temple, possibly at the end of the 19th century.

Before its construction, believers awaited the arrival of the priest of Villa Unión with his portable altar to perform the sacraments. This generated the indifference of the faithful to their religious obligations, which alarmed the ecclesiastical authorities. It was finally authorized by Lázaro de la Garza y Ballesteros, bishop of Sonora, who authorized its construction on March 19, 1831. Its original construction was in raw adobe.

In May 2016, some gang members graffitied the exterior wall of the church. After the incident, residents of the area demanded more surveillance. On May 21, 2022, an assailant assaulted a priest in the atrium of the church, taking money from him and escaping from the scene.

== Gallery ==
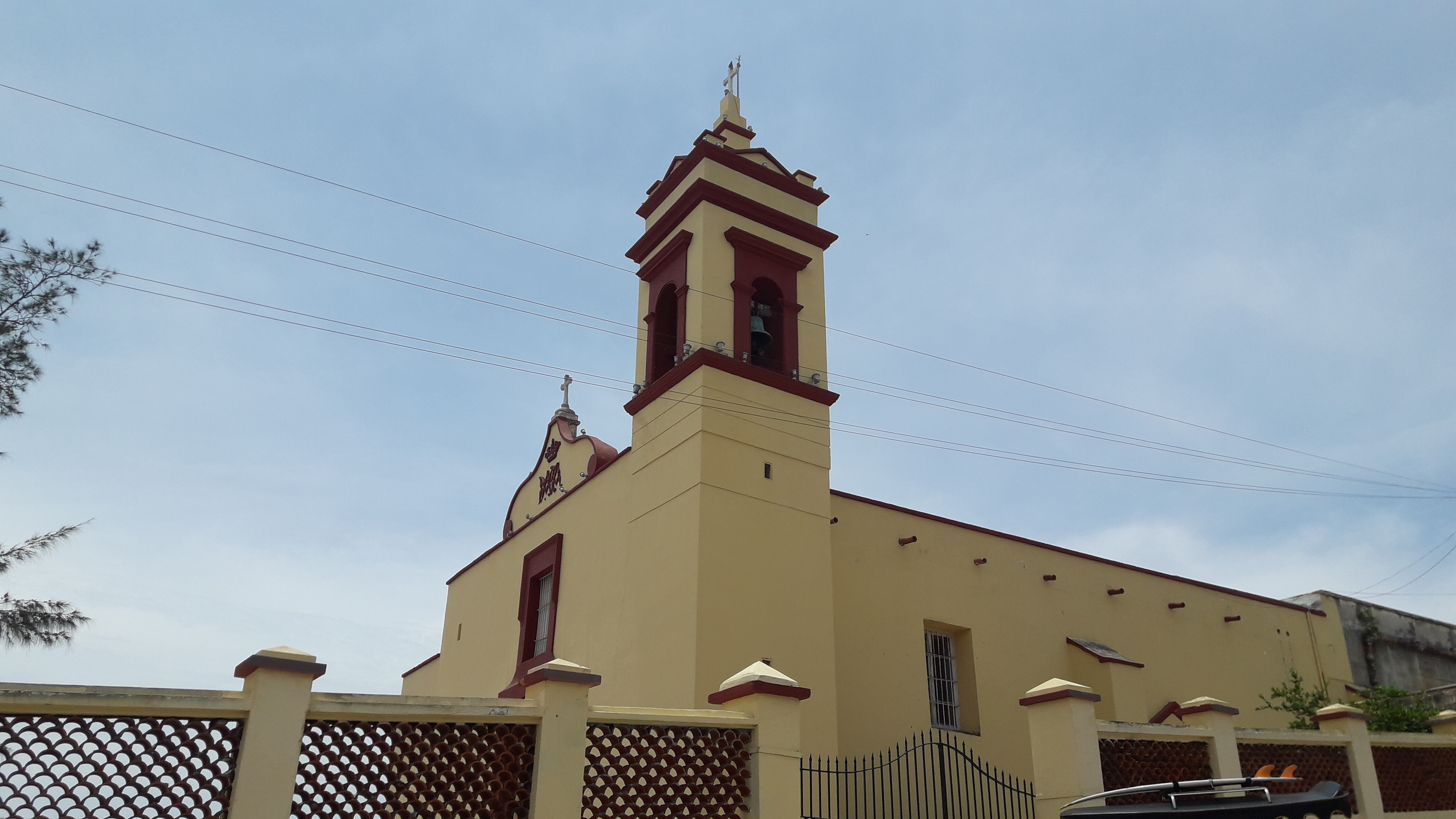
Templo de San José in 2023

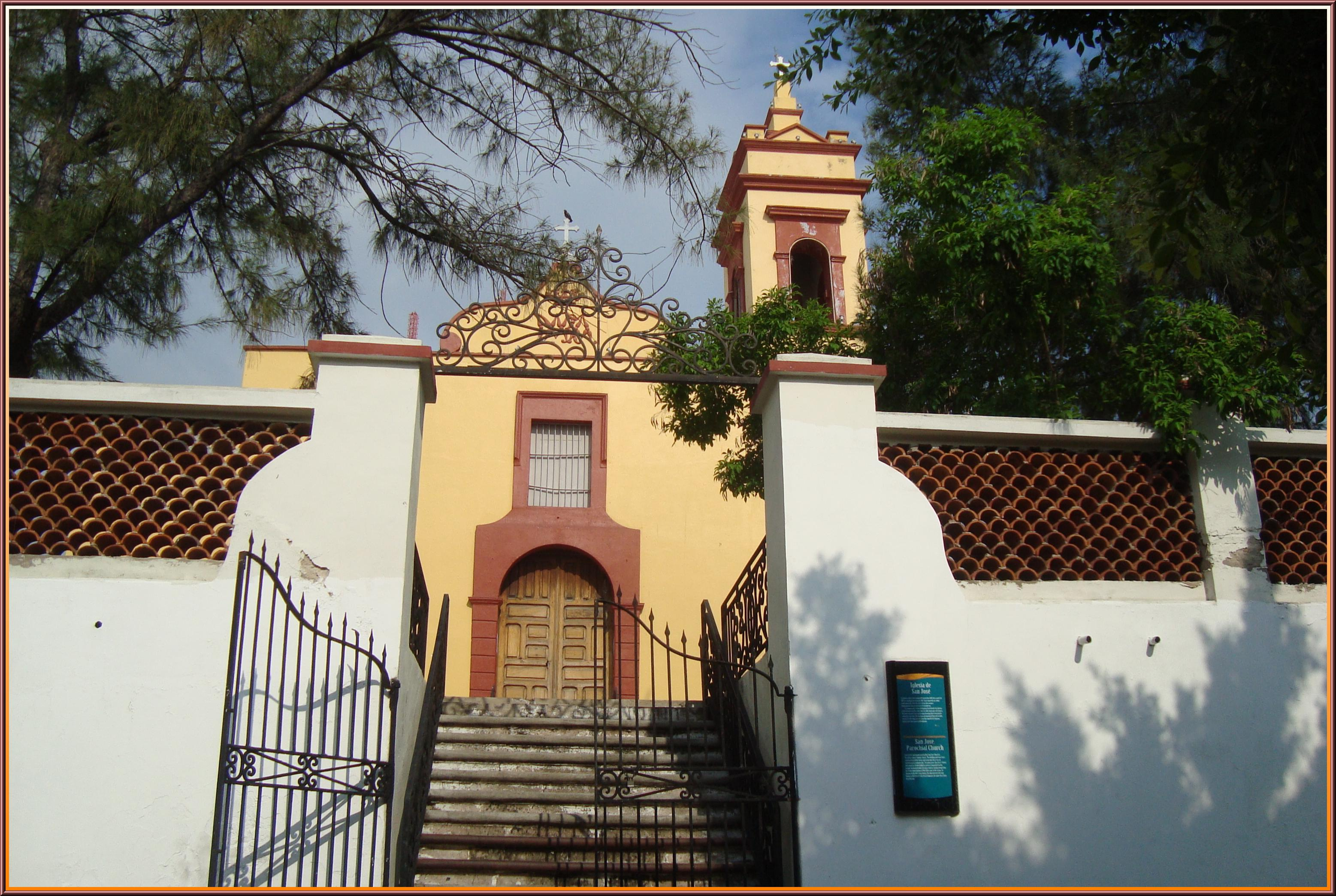
Main entrance

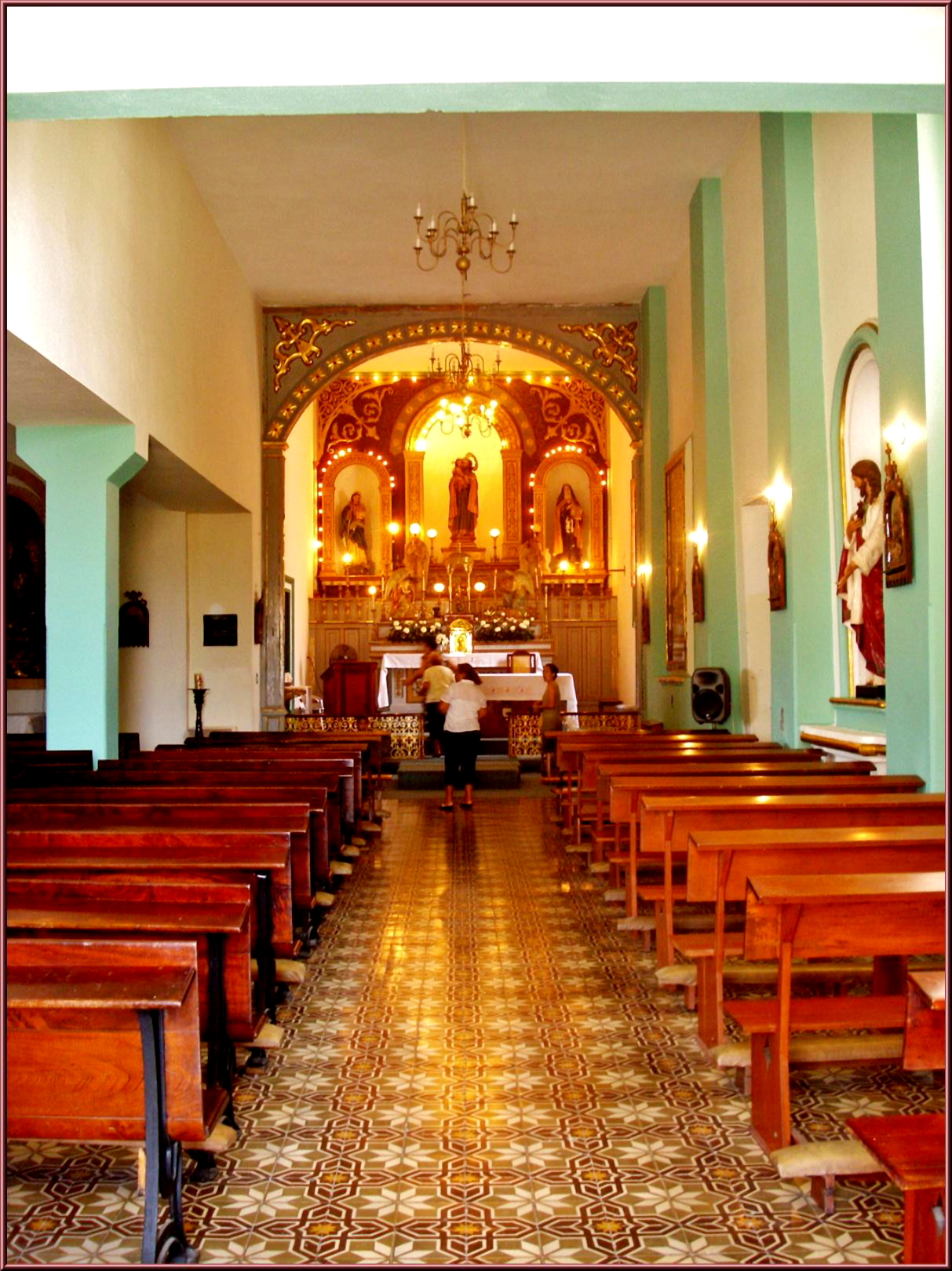
Temple interior

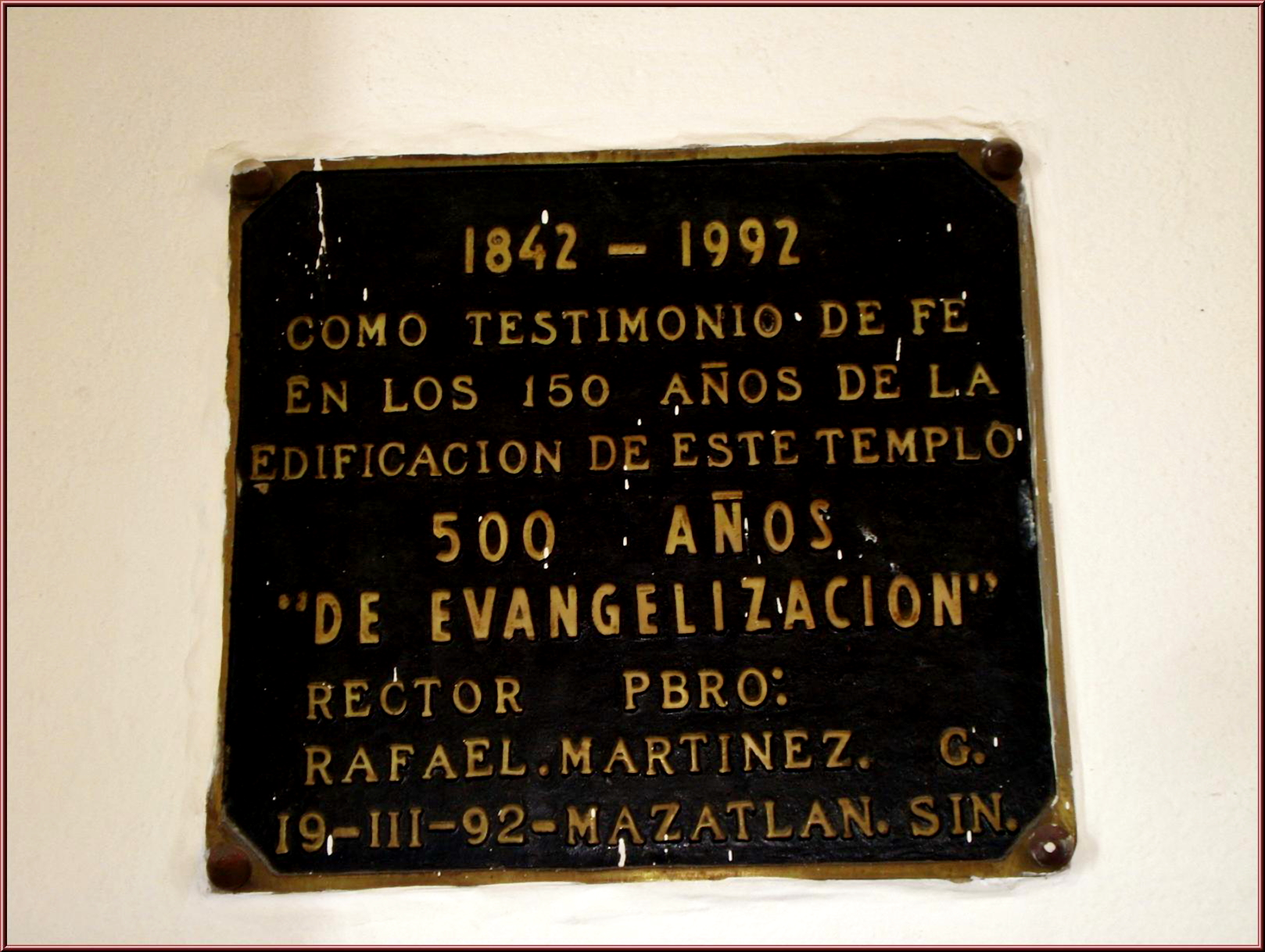
Commemorative plaque for the 150th anniversary of its construction

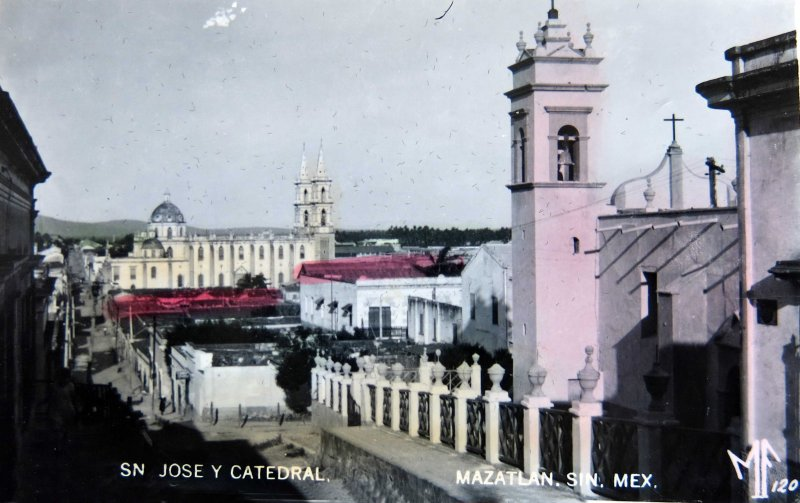
Temple of Saint Joseph and the Cathedral
