= Richard MacNeish =

American archaeologist

Richard Stockton MacNeish (April 29, 1918 – January 16, 2001), known to many as "Scotty", was an American archaeologist. His fieldwork revolutionized the understanding of the development of agriculture in the New World and the prehistory of several regions of Canada, the United States and Central and South America. He pioneered new methods in fieldwork and materials analysis and brought attention to the importance of interdisciplinary collaboration. His legacy has influenced generations of archaeologists.

== Early life and education ==
Richard Stockton MacNeish was born April 29, 1918, in New York City. His interest in archaeology started at a young age, sparked by a hastily created report on the Maya for an art history class when he was twelve. A year later he wrote to prominent Maya archaeologist Dr. A.V. Kidder asking for a job at his dig at Chichen Itza. Although his request was gently refused, Kidder encouraged MacNeish to study hard and become an archaeologist.

In 1936, MacNeish started his university career at Colgate College (now Colgate University) and participated in several archaeological field schools in New York and Arizona where he learned important excavation skills that he would later modify to create his own excavation techniques. Of this time, MacNeish writes: "My energy was boundless: I dug, I hiked, I climbed cliffs, I learned, I went to dances, I mixed cement by hand, I caught rattlesnakes, I packed mules. Most important, I did and talked archaeology morning, noon, and night – and loved every moment of it". He continued to be influenced by Dr. Kidder, and refined his field archaeology methods under George Brainerd, eventually forming his personal excavation technique La Perre.

At the urging of several Southwestern archaeologists, MacNeish prepared to transfer to the University of Chicago to study under Fay-Cooper Cole. Before doing so, however, he had an unrelated feat to achieve. As a child, his mother enrolled him in boxing lessons and he had become quite accomplished. Now, he wanted to win a Golden Gloves championship. He did so in New York in 1938, wearing a kilt in the final bout as a tribute to his Scottish ancestry. This skill continued to provide him with spending money during his student years.

At the University of Chicago, he participated in field schools that exposed him to the methods and theories of James A. Ford, William Haag, Jesse D. Jennings, John Cotter, Glen Black, Tom Lewis, and Madeline Kneberg. In addition, he was heavily influenced by Julian Steward's Basin-Plateau Aboriginal Sociopolitical Groups (1938). He earned his B.A. in 1940, his M.A. in 1944 and his Ph.D. in 1949. That same year, while working in the Sierra de Tamaulipas, Mexico, MacNeish discovered primitive teosinte corncobs in context with human habitations dating back several thousand years. This achievement spurred his lifelong interest in the origins of agriculture and society that would take him throughout Central and South America, eventually to China and, nearly, to Turkey. This last trip was put on hold when doctors ordered him to rest after a mild heart attack. After a long, varied and influential career, Richard MacNeish at age 83 died on January 16, 2001, in a car accident while touring Pre-Columbian Maya sites in Belize.

== Academic career ==
Shortly before his transfer to Chicago, during continued fieldwork in Arizona, MacNeish set out his future goals. "First I would learn to dig well and skillfully, then I would become able to analyze archaeological findings, and finally I would become a theoretician". It was during his fieldwork as an undergraduate and graduate student that he worked on his first goal. At field schools across the United States, MacNeish absorbed the knowledge and techniques of anyone he worked with. Synthesis of this knowledge came to fruition during fieldwork in the state of Tamaulipas in Mexico. Here MacNeish made one of his important contributions to the field methods of archaeologists, fulfilling his first goal. He pioneered a method of excavating caves that involved the stripping the strata off alternate squares from a vertical profile. This allowed for greater detail and more meaningful divisions of an excavation. Where many previous methods involved digging by arbitrary levels, the new method — dubbed the La Perre technique after the cave in which it was first developed — dug each distinct strata, or floor, separately.

His discovery in these caves of very early maize domestication evidence also brought home to him the importance of interdisciplinary studies as he struggled to get dating and identification information on his samples. He realized that in getting an education archaeologists, "... spend much of their time learning phonemics, personality and culture, esoteric kinship systems, strange customs of primitive peoples, and so forth and do not have time for fields like botany, zoology, pollen analysis, soils, and geology – all disciplines they will have to use". In order to rectify this, MacNeish began to involve experts outside of archaeology in many of his field studies. This policy was very well demonstrated in his excavations in the Tehuacan Valley and Ayacucho, Peru which resulted in multi-volume publications which analyzed the sites "utilizing the skills of all appropriate scientific fields".

In 1949, MacNeish went to work for the National Museum of Canada. With this he began a system of spending his summers surveying and excavating in Northern and Western Canada and his winters searching for evidence of the origins of agriculture across Central America. "MacNeish enjoyed saying 'I have as much sense as a duck – I fly south in the winter'". Realizing that a random search for sites over these huge swathes of territory would be difficult and inefficient, he pioneered a five-step process that was based on making and then testing hypotheses about ancient environments and human behavior in them. These steps were:

1. Initial background preparation on area to be surveyed
2. Preliminary hypothesis ... based on background materials and cultural sequential generalizations ...
3. Testing hypothesis in the field, modifying and setting up new hypotheses, testing them, and so on.
4. Field analysis of artifacts from sites to establish preliminary chronology ... and to determine potential stratified sites or sites with special features.
5. Resurvey for contextual data and special problems.

Using this process, he discovered hundreds of new sites and gained a reputation for "lucky" finds, while actually advancing the scientific foundation of archaeology.

MacNeish added to the understanding and analysis of archaeological materials through the championing of the interdisciplinary approach. In addition, his work on the standardization and computerization of lithic-attribute terminology enabled more sophisticated statistical analysis and generalization of the results. His ceramic analysis helped to reevaluate the prehistory of the Iroquois, disputing the idea that they had developed elsewhere and then migrated into their historic territory. His method of analysis demonstrated continuity between historic period groups and prehistoric complexes in the same areas.

In addition to the field and lab work MacNeish has been a professor at Boston University and the University of Calgary, where he helped to found their Department of Archaeology. He was the Whidden Lecturer at McMaster University, Senior Archaeologist at the National Museum of Canada, and was the director of the Robert S. Peabody Museum of Archaeology in Andover, Massachusetts. When he left the museum in 1983, instead of retiring, he established the Andover Foundation for Archaeological Research (AFAR), named himself Director of Research and continued his work in the American Southwest and China.

=== Coxcatlan Cave ===
In the 1960s, MacNeish discovered the Coxcatlan Cave in Puebla, Mexico. This was a very important site of early maize domestication.

It is due to his extensive study that much of the historical and cultural record there was established, especially from the Archaic period when the cave was most active. The cave produced domesticated plants dated between 5,000 and 3,400 BC, including maize. At that time, the people and animals living in Tehuacan Valley divided their time between small hunting encampments and large temporary villages.

== Pendejo Cave ==
In 1990, while digging at Pendejo Cave in southern New Mexico, MacNeish discovered the remains of a prehistoric horse, which were found above several other cultural layers in the cave.

The cave, and its significance, occupied the rest of his career. There was considerable controversy in regard to the very early dates of human presence there that he reported.

== Awards and honors ==
MacNeish was awarded honorary degrees from the Universidad de San Cristobal de Huamanga in Ayacucho, Peru and Simon Fraser University in British Columbia, Canada. He was elected to the National Academy of Sciences, British Academy of Science and the American Academy of Arts and Sciences and was awarded a Guggenheim Fellowship. He served as president of the Society for American Archaeology and has received numerous awards, including the Kidder Medal from the American Anthropological Association, the Spinden Medal for Archaeology from the Smithsonian Institution, and the Fiftieth Anniversary Award for Outstanding Contributions to American Archaeology from the Society for American Archaeology. In 1977 he was awarded the Cornplanter Medal for his work in Iroquois research. In addition he has been honored by institutions for his work in Mexico and China.

== Legacy ==
MacNeish's ultimate goal was to make archaeology more of a science. He was a processual archaeologist who championed the necessity of experimental archaeology and hypothesis testing in the exploration of human cultural ecology. By adopting, creating or championing methods that made archaeological results more generalizable and amenable to hypothesis testing MacNeish was attempting to learn, and teach, about the broader patterns of social change that can inform our choices in the future; he wished to use archaeology to improve the human condition. "... laws of cultural change may be of use not only in explaining the past, but more important, in predicting the future or at least indicating the steps in cultural change we might take in the future". His ultimate legacy, the sum total of all of his individual accomplishments in methodology and theory, was his commitment to archaeology as a science that could produce laws and theories to aid humanity in the future. In his autobiographical discussion of American archaeology (1978), MacNeish writes, "We are still fumbling along, perfecting techniques as well as improving methodology, and our field – as well as I – have a long way to go".

MacNeish was constantly calling for others to question his conclusions and improve his methods to further advance the science of archeology and its ability to speak to society's needs. As a result, his greatest legacy is probably his influence on and encouragement of students, other archaeologists and professionals he worked with. One of these students, Barry Rolett, recalls how "MacNeish encouraged and invested his time in students like me because he loved to share the excitement of archaeology" and "led by example and he used his considerable influence more to help others than for his own personal gain".

== Published works ==
By his own accounting, Richard MacNeish "spent 8,071 days in the field and wrote more than 9 million words". His many publications include:

- For information on his life and on American archaeology: The Science of Archaeology?, 1978
- For his theories on agriculture and civilization worldwide: The Origins of Agriculture and Settled Life, 1992 (ISBN 0806123648)
- For reports on his big field projects: The Prehistory of the Tehuacan Valley Vol. 1-5, 1967–1972, or Prehistory of the Ayacucho Basin, Peru Vol. 1-4, 1980-83 (Ed. by MacNeish)
- On the Iroquois: Iroquois pottery types: A technique for the study of Iroquois prehistory, 1952 (in the Bulletin of the National Museum of Canada)
- On Chinese agriculture: Origins of Rice Agriculture: The Preliminary Report of the Sino-American Jiangxi (PRC) Project: SAJOR, 1995 (with J.G. Libby, in Publications in Anthropology, No. 13)

== See also ==
- Agriculture in Mesoamerica
- Domesticated plants of Mesoamerica
