= Coxcatlan Cave =

Mesoamerican archaeological site

Coordinates: 18°16′2″N 97°8′57″W

Coxcatlan Cave is a Mesoamerican archaeological site in the Tehuacán Valley, State of Puebla, Mexico. It was discovered by Richard MacNeish in the 1960s during a survey of the Tehuacán Valley. It was the initial appearance of three domesticated plants in the Tehuacan Valley (Puebla, Mexico) that allowed an evaluation to be done again of the overall temporal context of the plant domestication in Mexico. In addition to plants, Coxcatlan Cave also provided nearly 75 percent of the classified stone tools from excavation.

== Overview ==
It was used over a span of 10,000 years, mostly during the Archaic period, as a shelter and gathering place during the rainy season for groups of foragers as large as 25–30 individuals. It is one of a collection of cave sites in the Tehuacan Valley. Each have similar archaeobotanical remains and cultural artifacts, representing a trade community present.

These "macroband" camps, made up of "microband" family groupings, would occupy cave sites in the region during a time when food resources were especially plentiful. Evidence of large quantities of food remains contributes to the belief that these caves were used for collecting and storing plants during periods of harvest. Some of the food included were small maize cobs and fragments of squash, chile, avocado, beans, and bottle gourd. The plants only made up 2 percent of the Archaic-period macrobotanical collection compared within 45 percentage in the overlying ceramic-bearing levels dating after 2000 BC.

== History ==
It is due to the extensive study of the site by Dr. Richard (Scotty) MacNeish that much of the historical and cultural record was established, especially from the Archaic period when the cave was most active. Coxcatlan Cave also produced domesticated plants in components dated between 5,000 and 3,400 BC, or better known as the Coxcatlan Phase. The Coxcatlan Phase was a phase where the people and animals living in Tehuacan Valley divided their time between small hunting encampments and large temporary villages.

== Location ==
The karst-formed 7 Coxcatlán cave is located in the Tehuacan Valley highlands amidst the dry thorn forest typical of the Sierra Madre mountainous region. The site and others in close proximity, are separated by the mountains from the coastal plain where the Olmec chiefdom of Tres Zapotes was located.

Some of the excavations done on the site appeared to be identified to be at least 42 separated occupation levels within 2–3 meters of sediments. The features identified at the site include hearths, cache pits, ash satters and organic deposits.

== Maize ==
Maize is known in archaeology of this area to be essential to sedentary life. The discovery of remains in this cave and others, then, is important to the archaeological record in this region. The development of agriculture is evidence of the Law of Least Effort and Romenʼs Rule, encouraging practices that promote higher productivity to secure and store a greater amount of food. The maize remains found at the site were radiocarbon dated to be from 5000 BC and were originally thought to be the earliest evidence of fully domesticated maize. However a further analysis discovered the first appearance of fully domesticated maize to be from ca. 2700 BC. This discovery allows archaeologists a frame of reference for the chronology of the progression of agriculture in Mesoamerican cultures. The time period following this introduction of maize oriented agriculture is called the Coxcatlan Phase, which includes the years 5700–3825 BC. The AMS of Coxcatlan Phase cultigens has produced substantially younger dates than those obtained by the conventional radiocarbon method.

== Artifacts ==
Some of the items of interest found in the cave include: a corn cob dated to 5000 BC; evidence of squash, beans, bottle gourds; along with an ink pen and containing vessels using pre-ceramic material. A later, more thorough study by Bruce D. Smith of museum-held artifacts from the region established a complete description of the remains in the cave, based on radioactive dating of the material. This analysis of temporally sensitive artifact types also produced information of 42 occupations, 28 habitation zones, and seven cultural phases. As of 2005, there are 71 radiocarbon dates are available to document the history of the site. The top seven archaeological zones of the cave contains evidence of ceramic periods of occupation in the cave. The evidence of archaeobotanical remains is also the greatest in these top layers, partially due to an obvious postdepositional disturbance of the cultural materials in the cave. Such action has been confirmed with radiocarbon dating by Smith and others. Dating in 2021 of bones of animals, possibly hunted and eaten, found in the cave to 30,000 years BP may lead to antedating the previously-accepted arrival date of humans in the Americas.
