= Ganot-Peschard Museum of Archeology =

Museo de Arqueología Ganot-Peschard
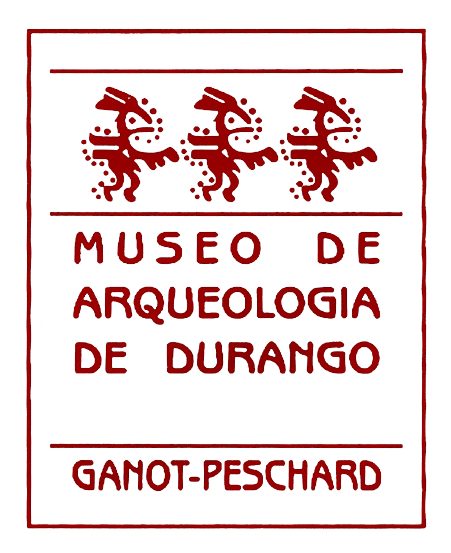

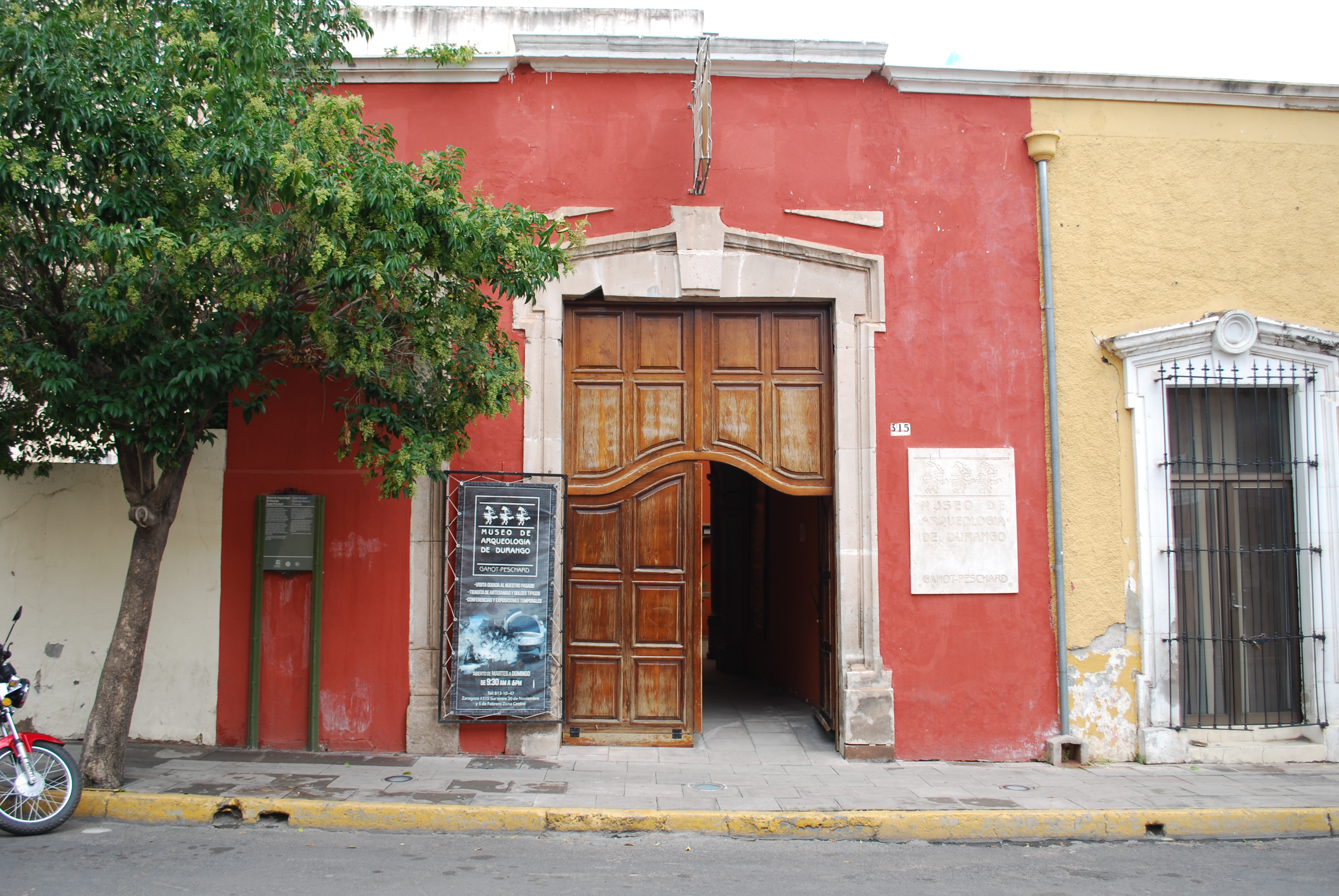

- Location in Mexico
- Established: August 3, 1998; 28 years ago
- Location: 315 Zaragoza, Zona Centra; Durango, Mexico
- Coordinates: 24.023821°N 104.671985°W
- Type: Archaeology museum
- Director: Alejandro Peschard Fernández
- Website: Museo de Arqueología Ganot-Peschard

The Museo de Arqueología Ganot-Peschard is an archaeology museum located in Zona Centro, Durango, Mexico. The museum plays a major role in preserving the indigenous history of Northern Mexico. The Ganot-Peschard's collection offers archeological materials from the region's landscapes and dwellings including, funeral urns, skulls, vessels, arrowheads, winches, pectorals and other ornamental materials of pre-Hispanic peoples. Its objective is to preserve and spread the archaeological heritage of Durango and the region formed by the states of Zacatecas, Sinaloa, Nayarit and Jalisco.

The Ganot-Peschard has seven permanent rooms: the Lytic Stage, Loma San Gabriel, Chalchihuita Culture, Guadiana Culture, Aztatlán Culture, Rock Art and The Archaeological Method.

Since opening, the museum has been visited by more than 250,000 people.

== Museum ==
The Ganot-Peschard was built at the end of the 19th century, and functioned over the years as a house-room, printing house, and state archive.

It is currently part of the catalog of historical monuments of the National Institute of Anthropology and History (INAH).

== Founding and Mission ==
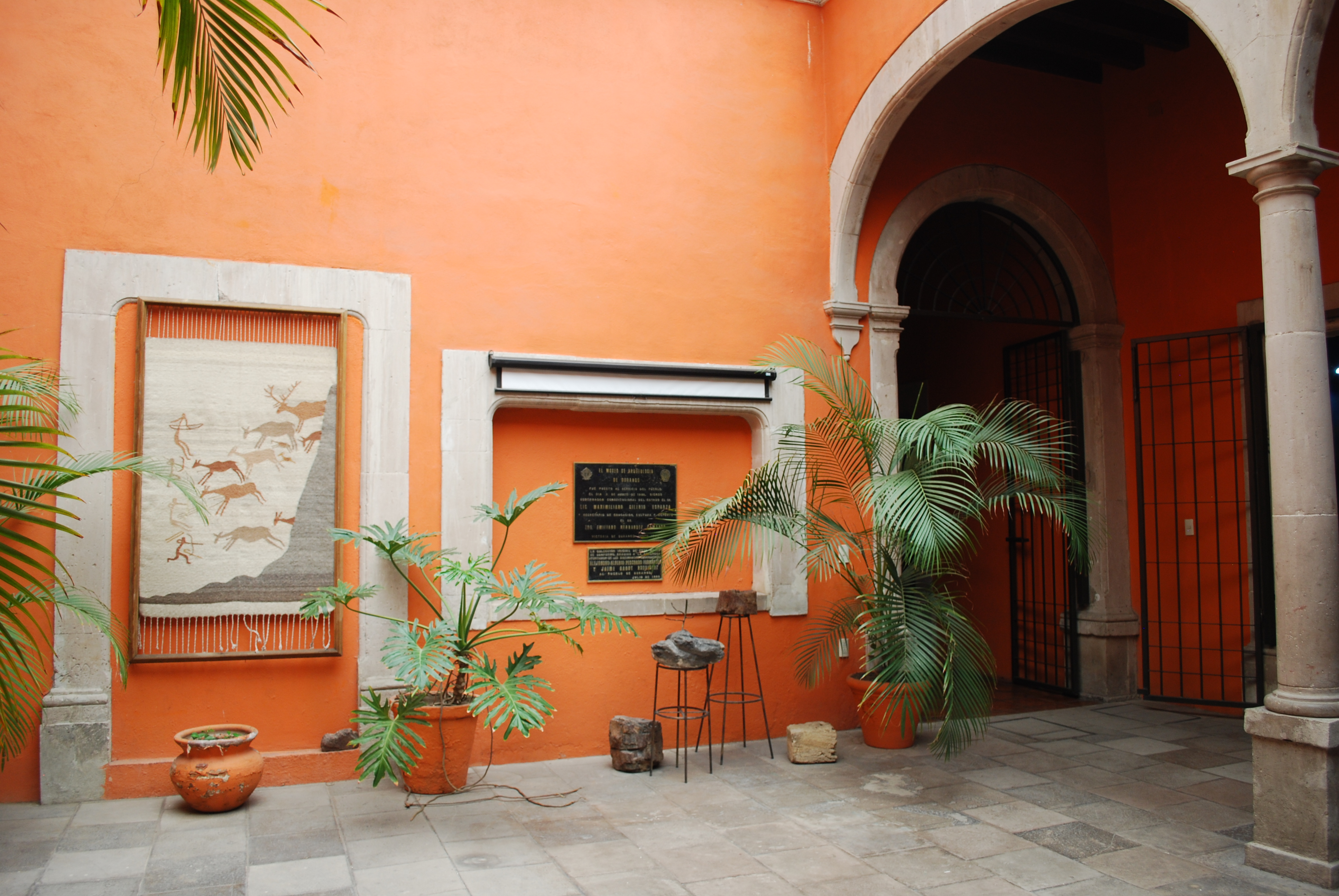
The entrance to Museo de Arqueología Ganot-Peschard

The building was restored in 1998 by the historian Javier Guerrero Romero and the architect Juan Águila. It was inaugurated as a museum on August 3, 1998 with the aim of preserving and disseminating the archaeological heritage of Durango and the region made up of the states of Zacatecas, Sinaloa, Nayarit, and Jalisco.

The Ganot-Peschard still maintains its primary objective: to preserve, study and disseminate Durango's archaeological heritage. It is an important repository of knowledge for the indigenous populations who have inhabited the states of Durango, Zacatecas, Sinaloa, Nayarit, and Jalisco for over 15,000 years.

== Building ==
The museum's facade is noted for its simplicity, as it shows only the access gate framed in quarry. The interior is small with only 7 permanent exhibition rooms. Of the exhibition rooms, the Loma San Gabriel Stage room is of particular significance, as it depicts types of housing and instruments (estimated to be around 3,000 years old) from the Loma San Gabriel culture, perhaps the forerunner of the contemporary Coras, Huichols, and Tepehuanes who still inhabit Durango.

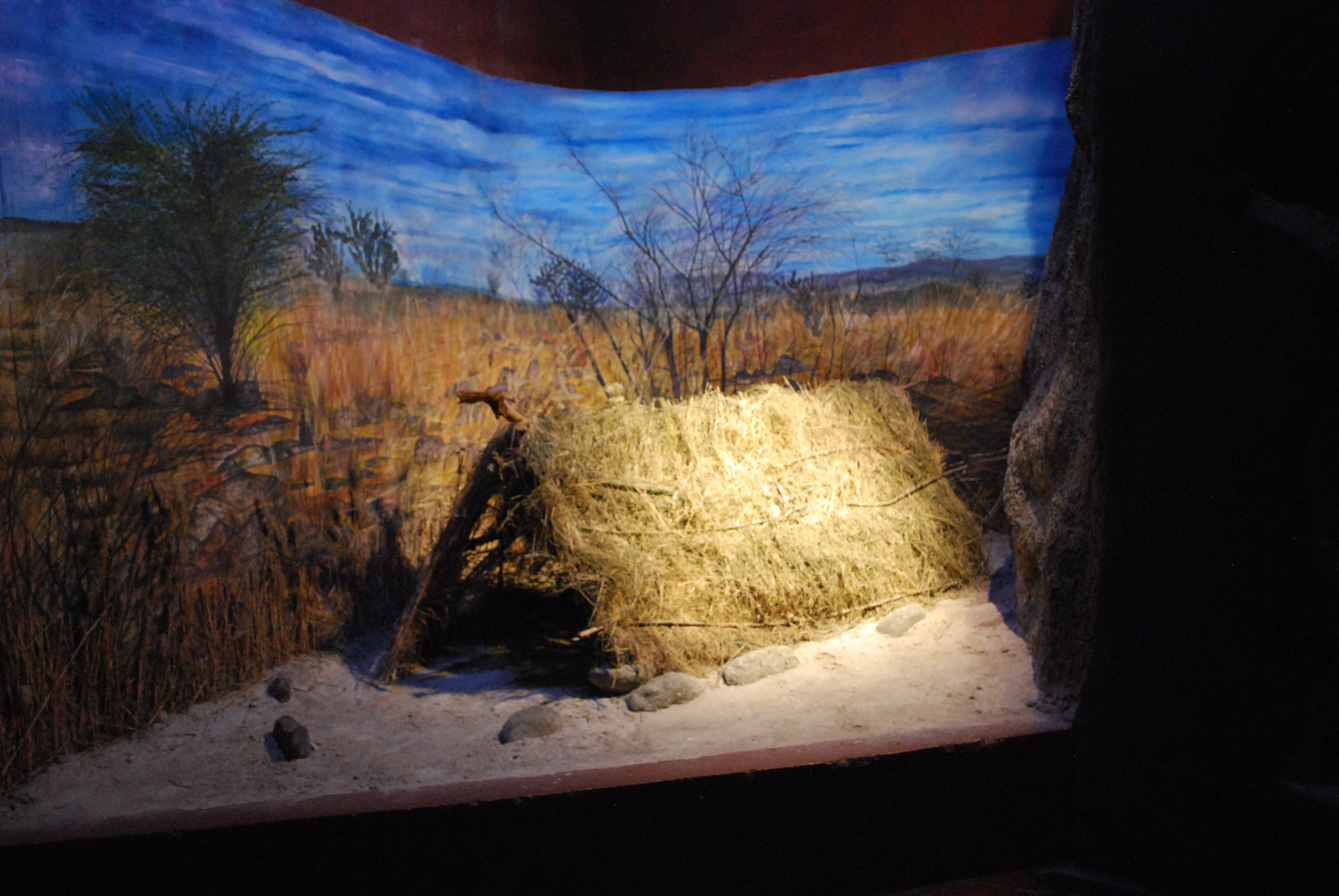
Loma San Gabriel style home.

The facilities consist of a lobby, a patio and two arcades where a mural of the State of Durango with its different areas is shown; the Semi Desert, the Plains, the Valleys, the Sierra Madre Occidental and the Quebradas.

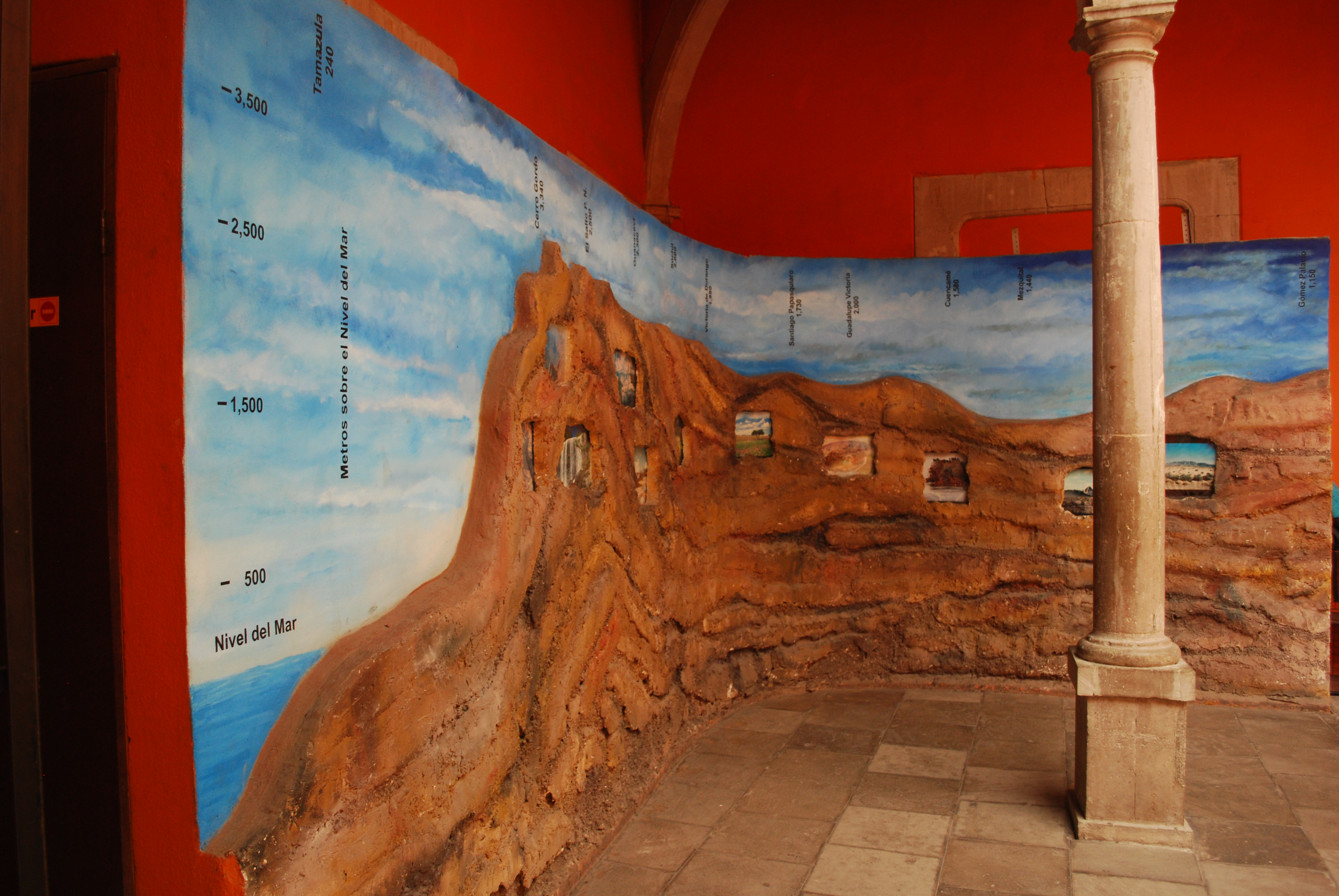
Mural depicting settlements in the State of Durango.

In addition to its exhibitions, the museum offers organized guided tours, walks through archaeological sites, clay modeling, and saddlery courses.

== Collection ==
The permanent exhibitions of the museum are listed as follows:

- Paleo-Indico y Arcaico, de antigüedad aproximada de 12,000-2000 años a.C.
- Loma San Gabriel, Primeros Asentamientos, 1000 a.C. al presente
- Cultura Chalchiuites, 200-850 d.C.
- Cultura Guadiana, 850-1300 d.C.
- Cultura Aztatlán, 1350 d.C. Hasta el contacto Español
- Pinturas Rupestres
- Método arqueológico

Much of the museum's materials were collected by Drs. Jaime Ganot Rodríguez and Alejandro Peschard Fernández over 30 years of research.

== Cultura Chalchiuites 200-850 d.C. ==
One of the main permanent exhibitions in the museum, Cultura Chalchiuites, features materials from the Chalchiuites culture, which existed from approximately 200-850 CE. The museum provides historical context for the rise of the culture and its ties to the Teotihuacan empire:

The expansion of the Teotihuacan empire began with trade routes that extended to the Southwestern United States, where trade in turquoise was important.

Following these routes, Teotihuacan astronomers arrived at the northernmost site where the sun moves during the year, and there they built a ceremonial center in Alta Vista, Chalchiuites, Zacatecas. In the current Tropic of Cancer, it functioned as an astronomical observatory, especially in determining the equinoxes.

From contact with the inhabitants who already populated the area, the Chalchiuites culture emerged, as it was fundamentally a hybrid culture. It had all but declined by AD 850, along with the Teotihuacán.

== Cultura Guadiana 850-1300 d.C. ==
Another primary permanent exhibition features materials from the Guadiana culture (850-1300 CE):

In 850 AD, a new expansion began in central Mexico. To the north was the Tolteca who primarily traded using two routes, one through the central part of the country and a second through the west towards the Pacific coast.

The tension created through the Toltec's use of the first route forced some of the Chalchiuites to migrate north and occupy part of what is now considered Durango. Through contact with the region's inhabitants, a new culture emerged; this people was initially called the Guadiana Branch of the Chalchiuites, but it has since been accepted as an entirely different culture. Its main ceremonial center was La Ferrería, very close to the current city of Durango.

=== Selected collection highlights ===
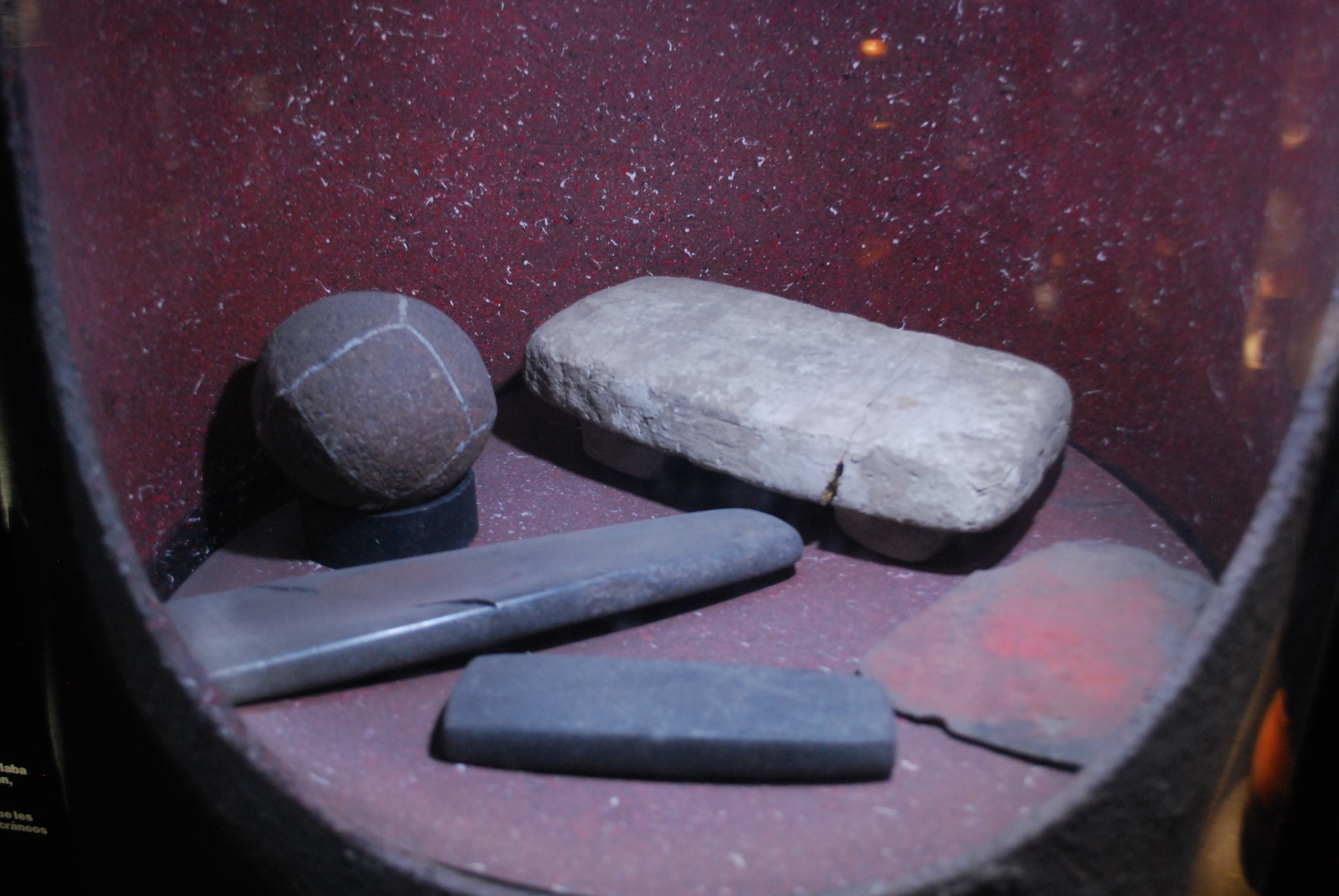

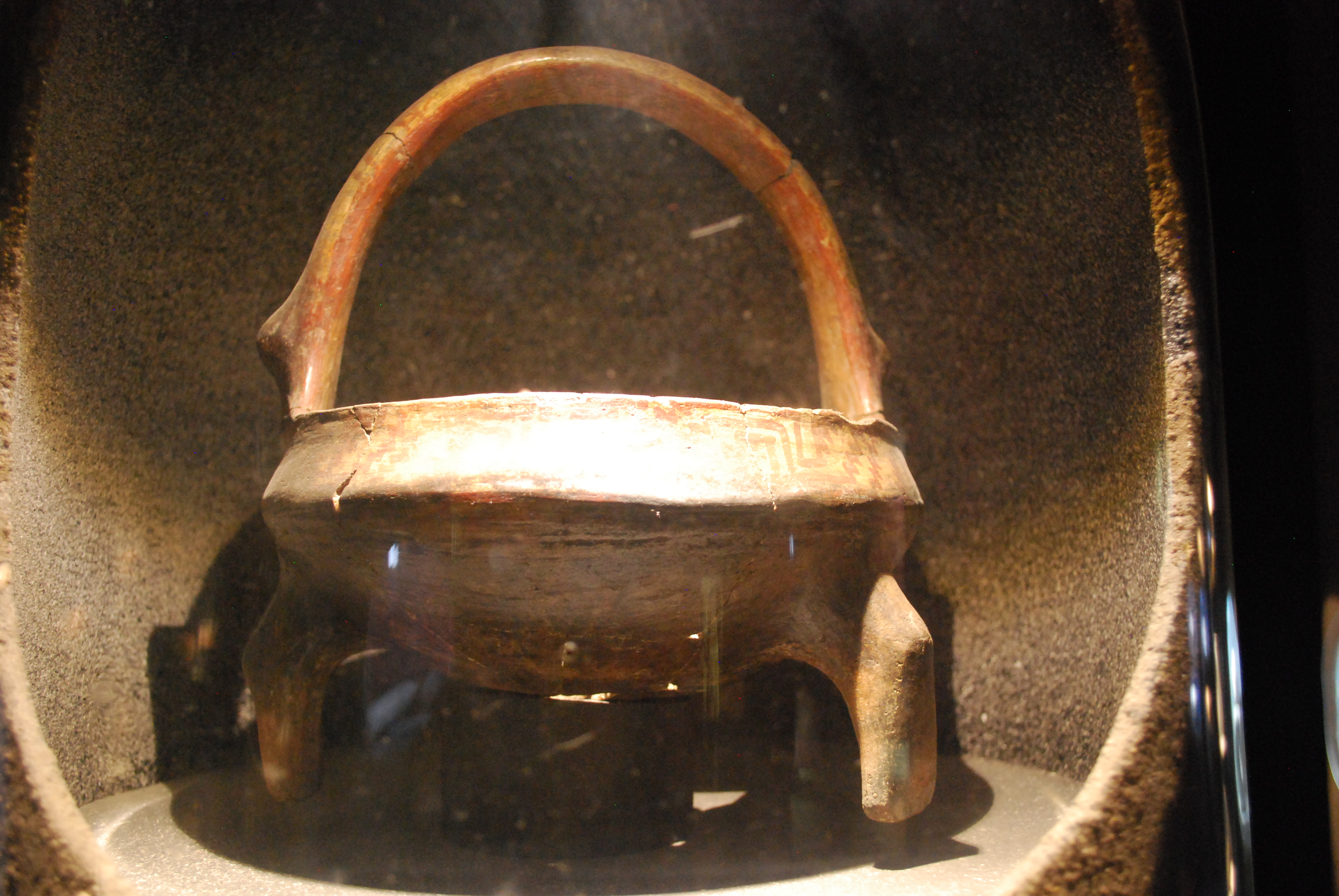

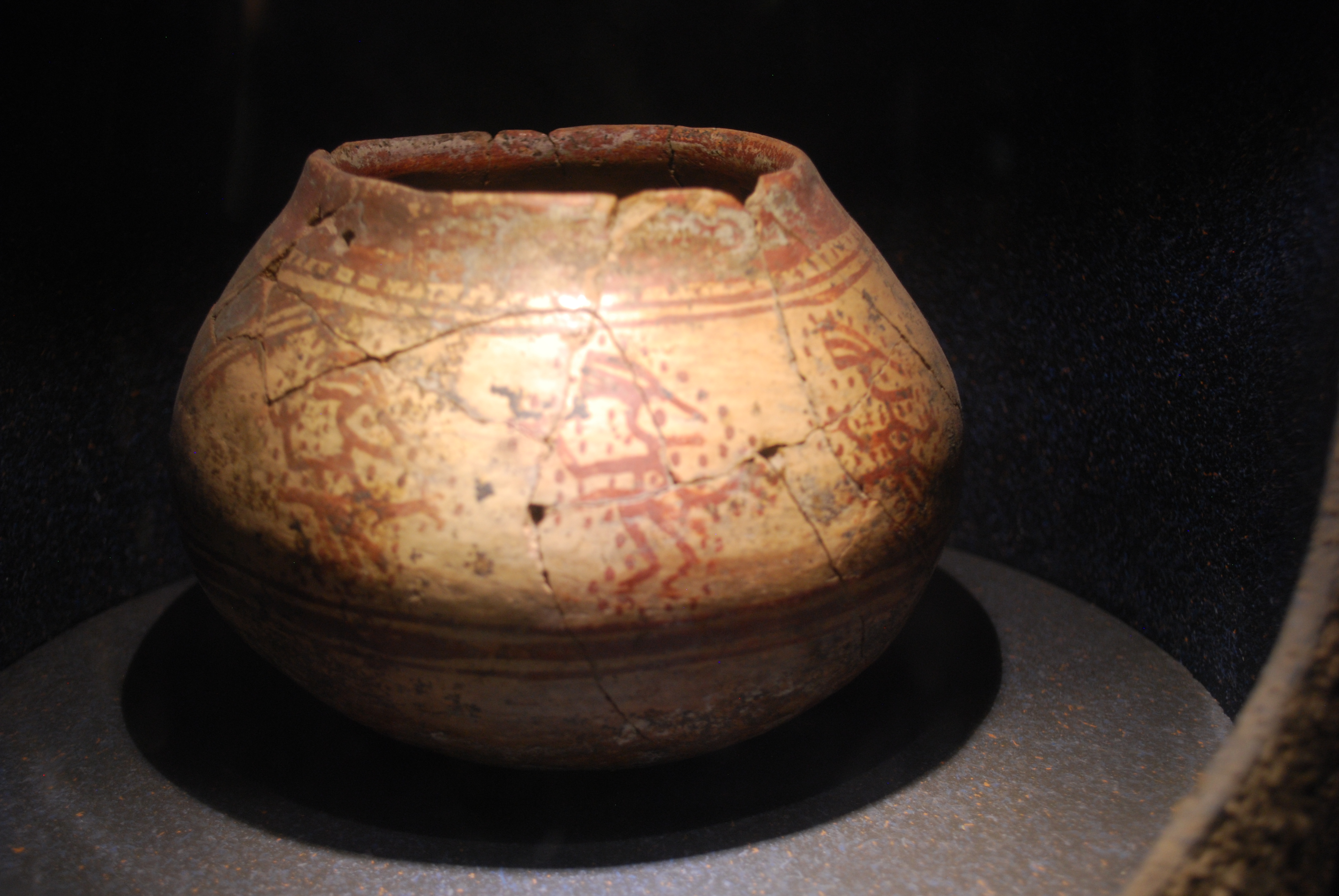

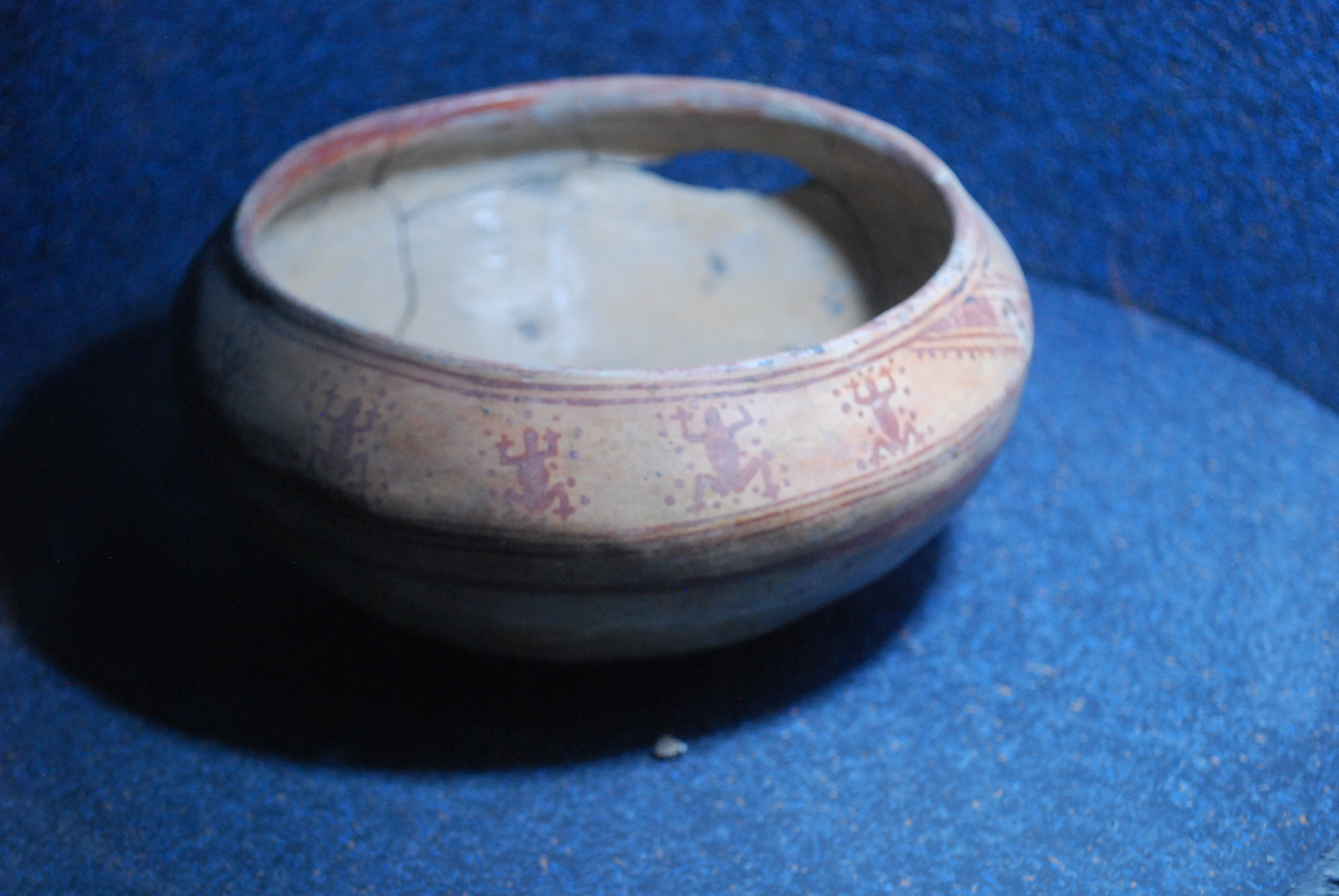

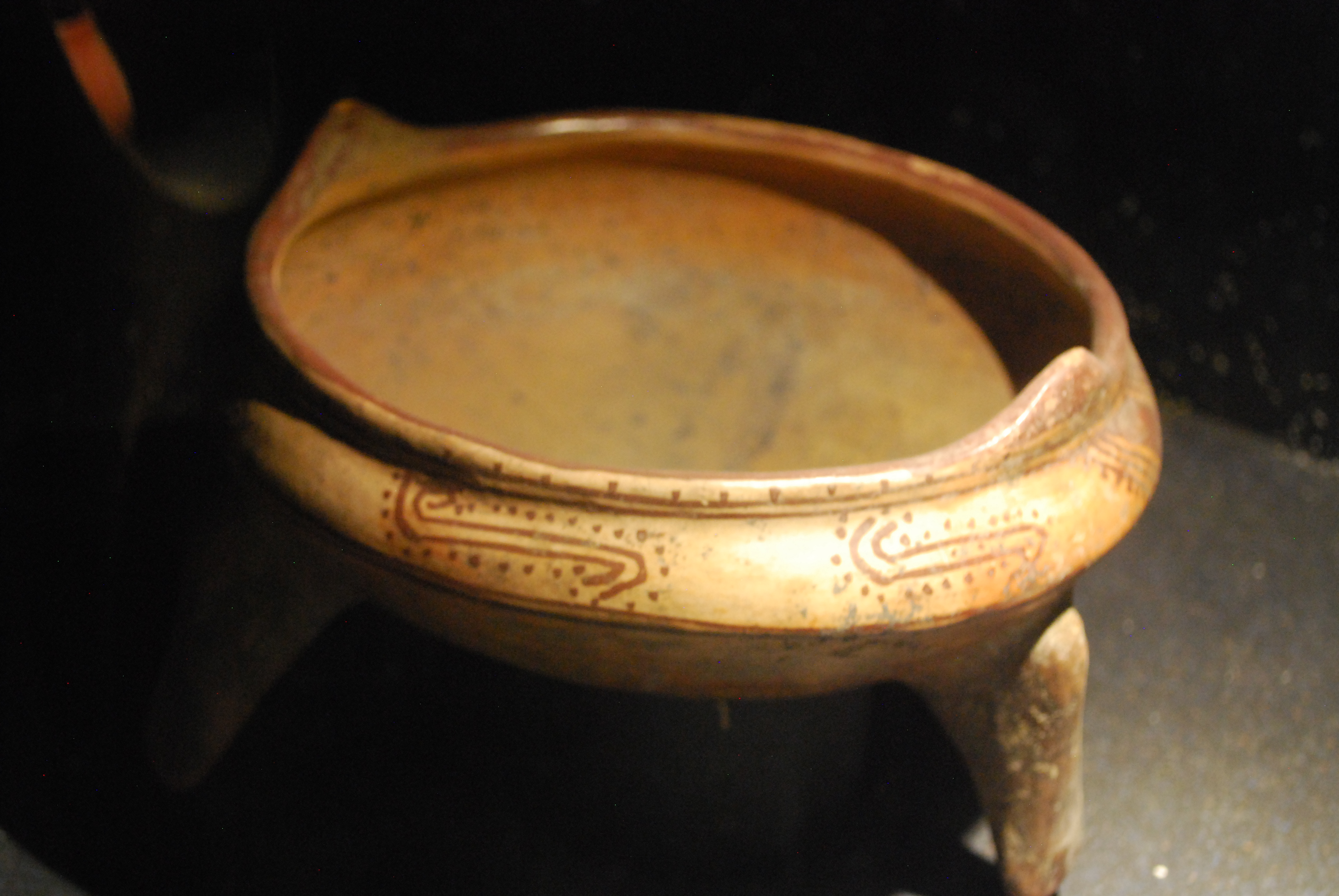

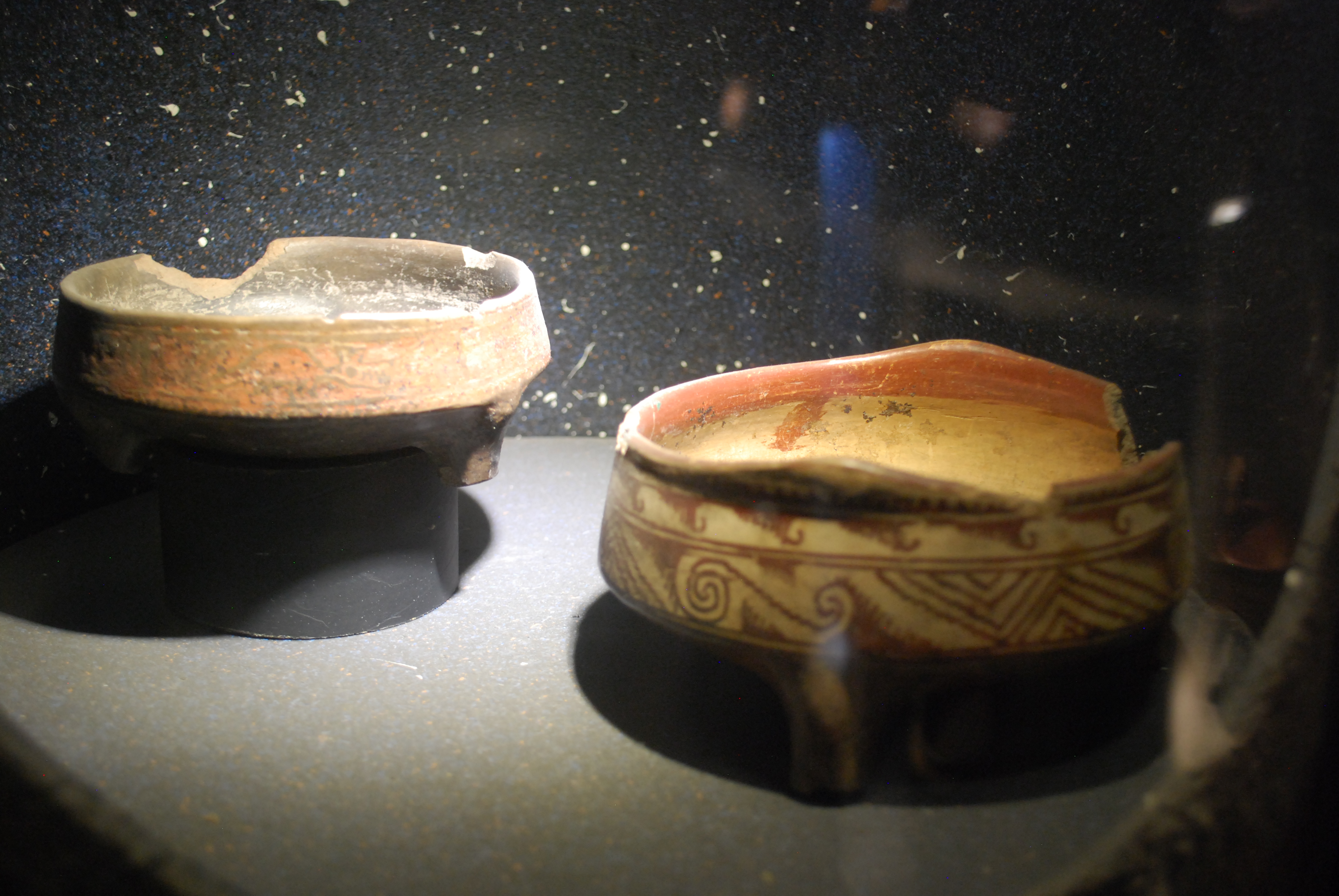

== Cultura Aztatlán 1350 d.C. ==
The museum's fifth exhibit features materials from the Aztatlán culture (1350 CE); it is subtitled Hasta el contacto Español:

The Aztatlán were inhabitants of a wide region of Western Mexico and the Pacific coast that extended to the current state of Sinaloa. Some branches had to migrate through the Sierra Madre Occidental to the center of the state of Durango where various archaeological sites bear evidence of this migration. Ceramics, copper objects, funeral urns, intentional cranial deformation, pipes, winches and objects decorated with gods from the Mesoamerican pantheon have been found.

The Aztatlán culture was mixed with the Guadiana culture. One of the people's characteristic art styles is a hybrid ceramic type appearing in a terminal phase close to Spanish contact called El Molino.

=== Selected collection highlights ===
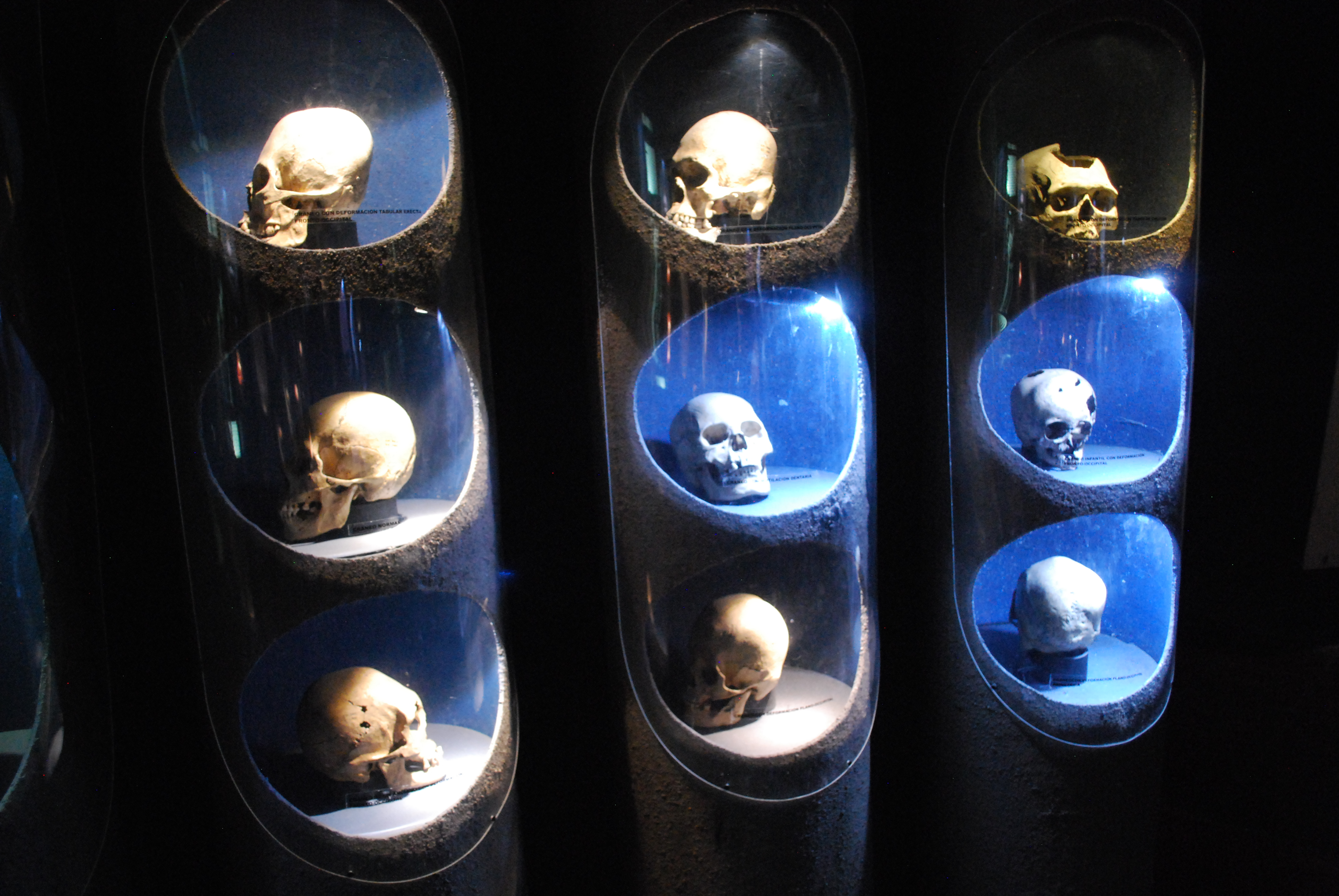

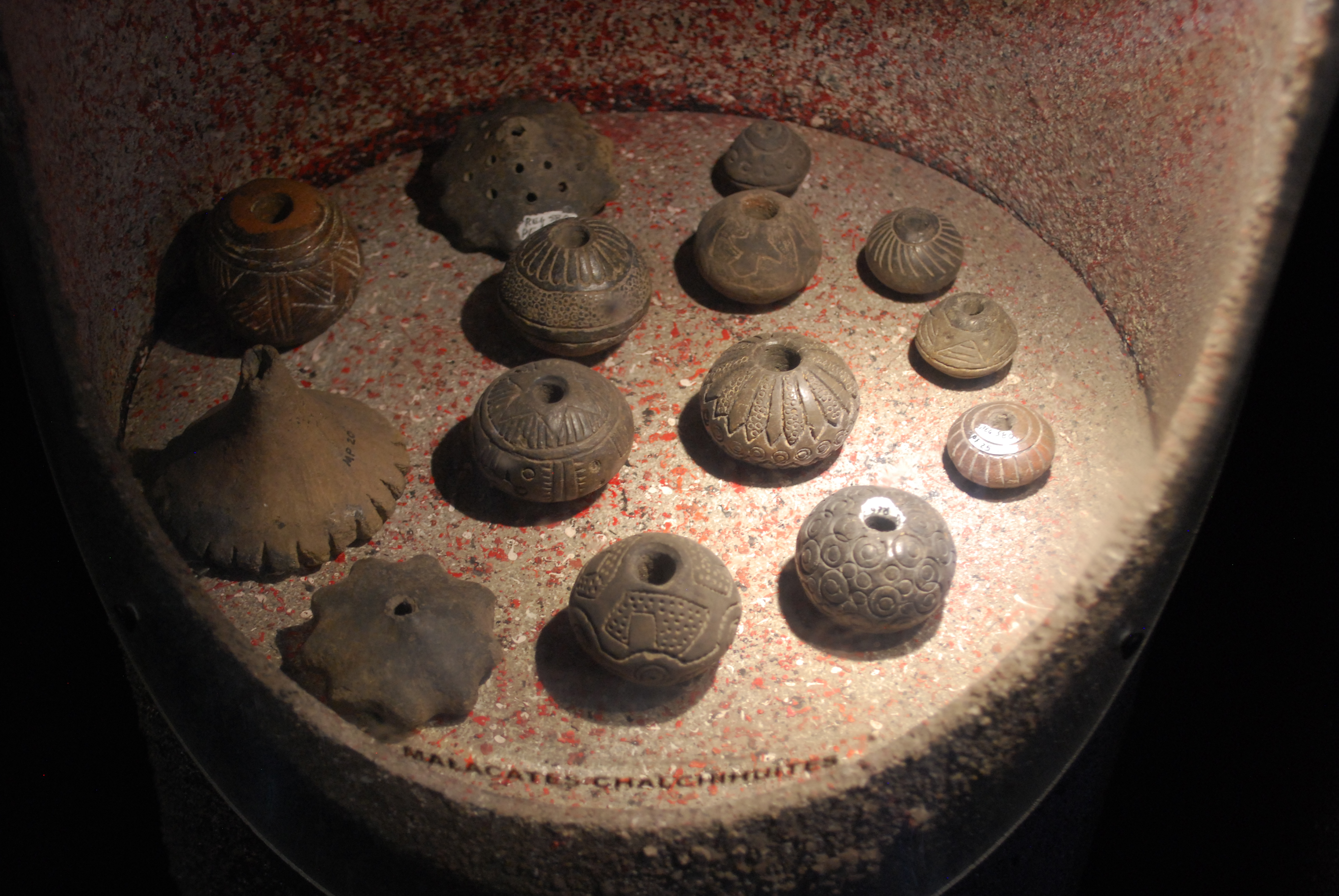

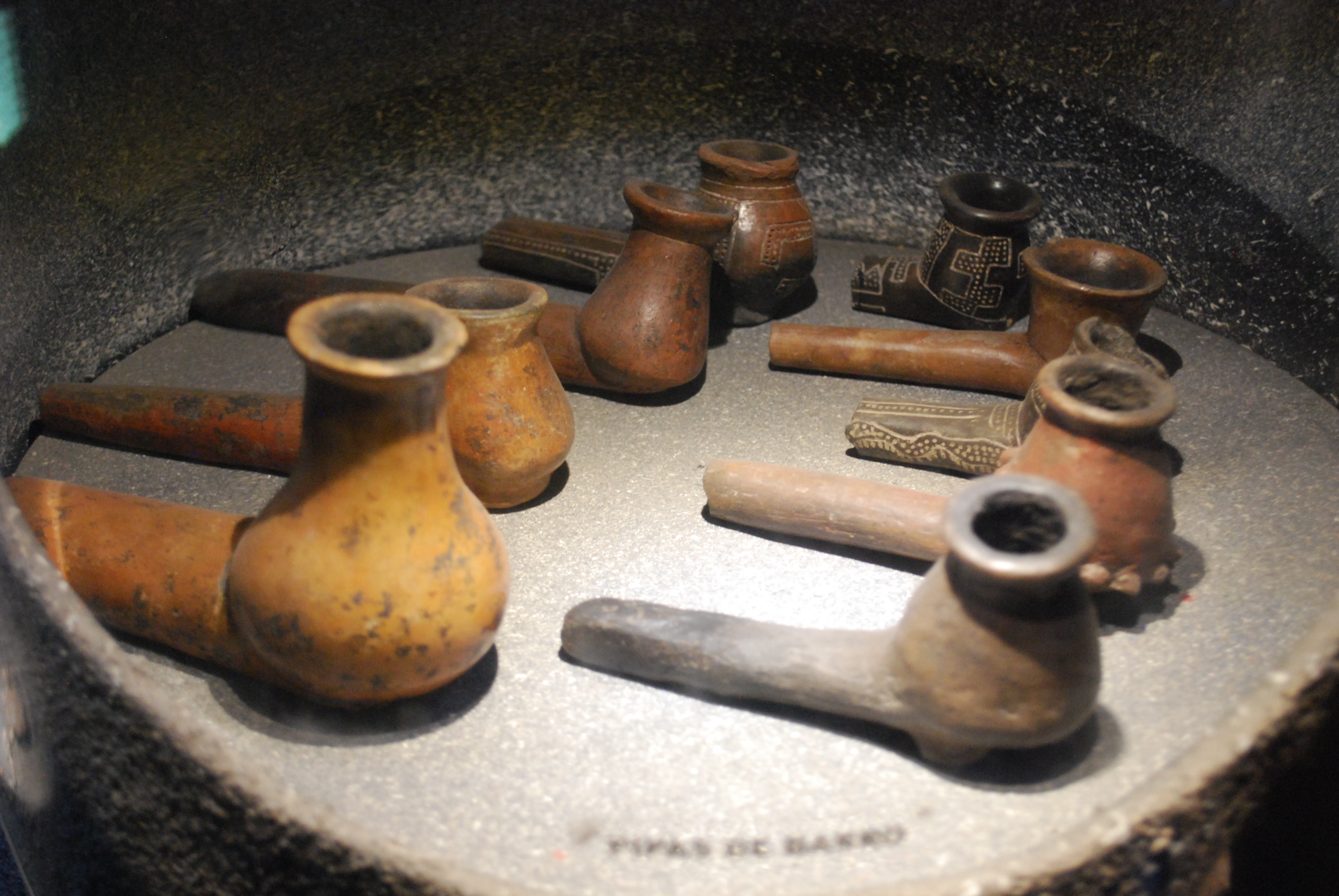

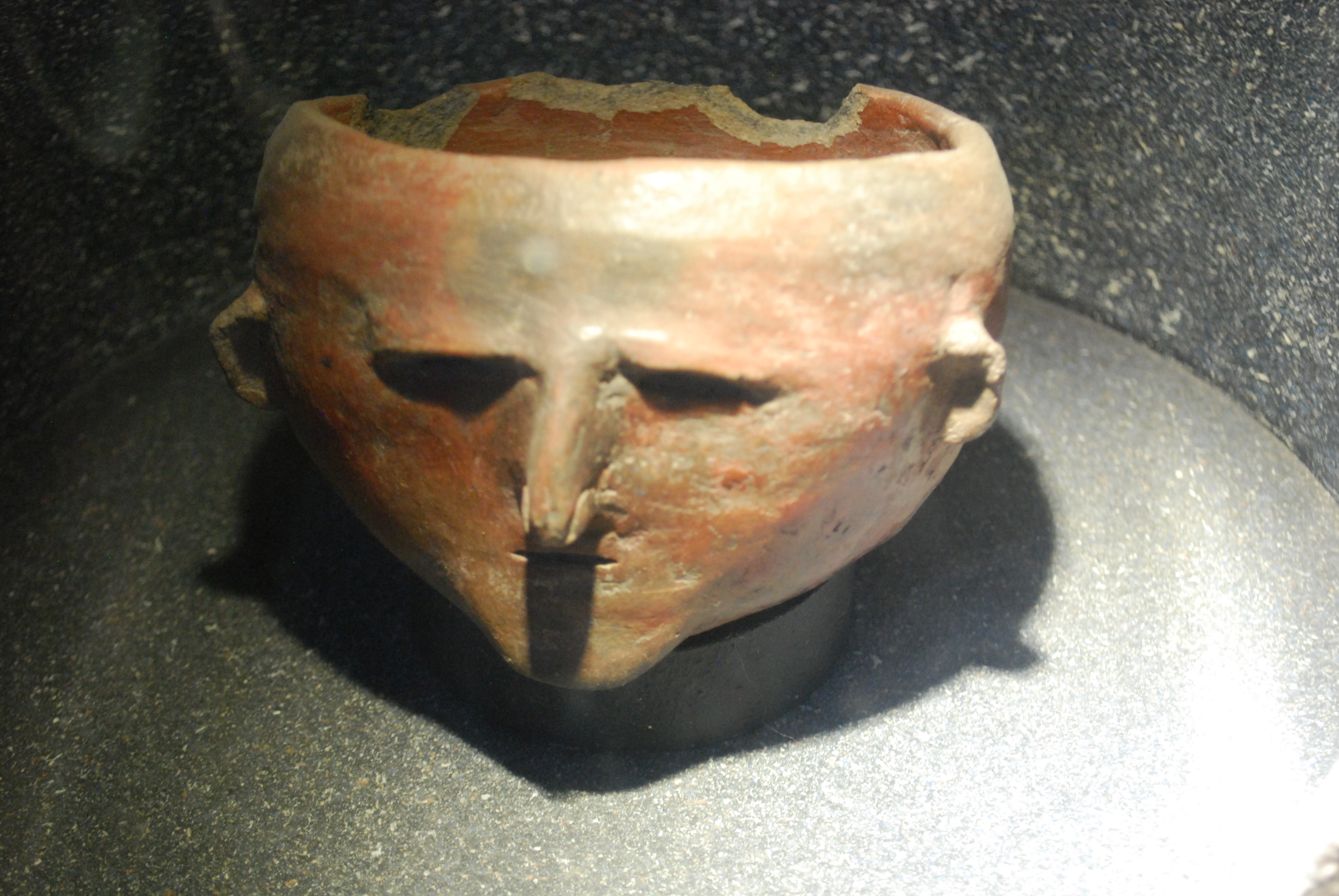

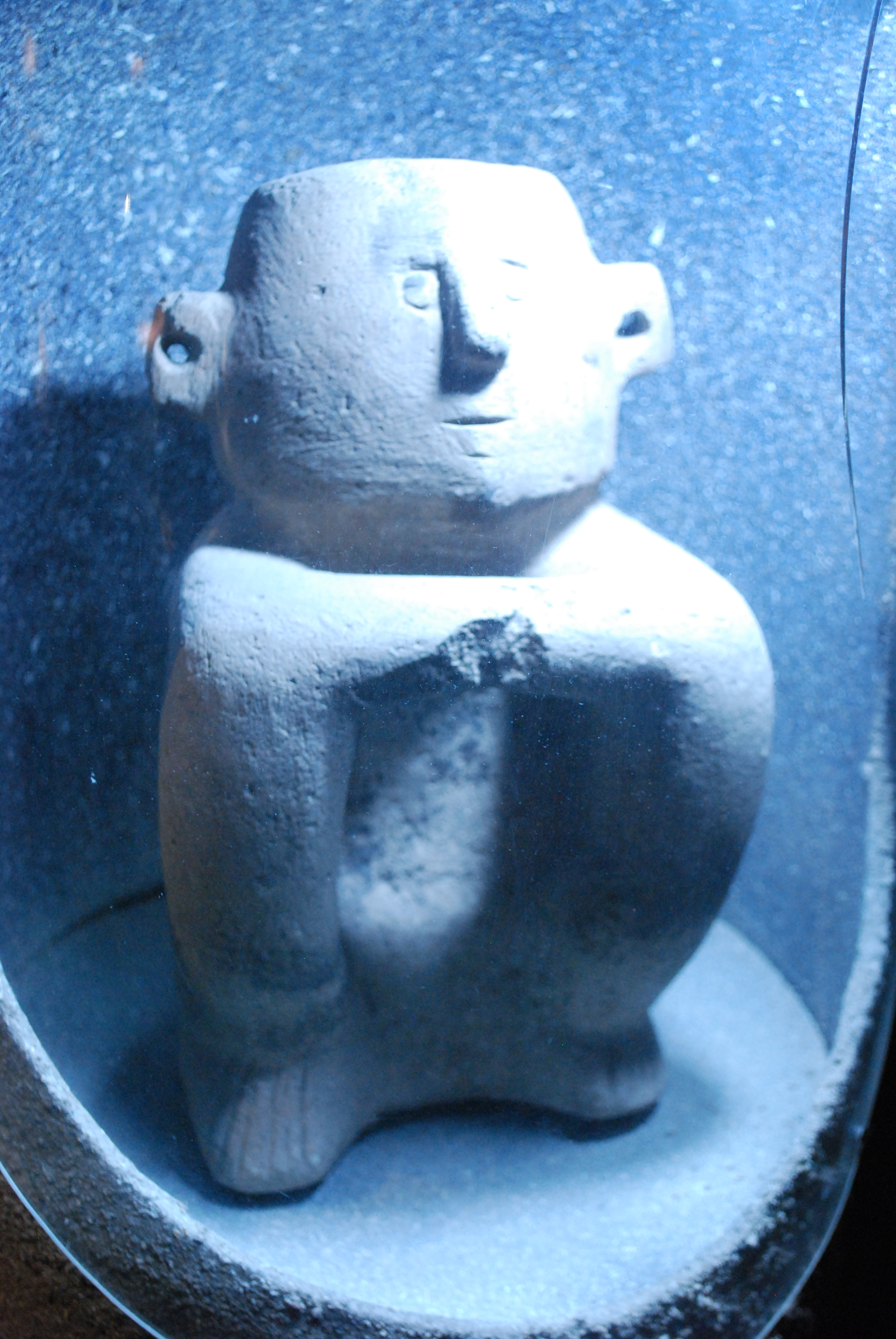

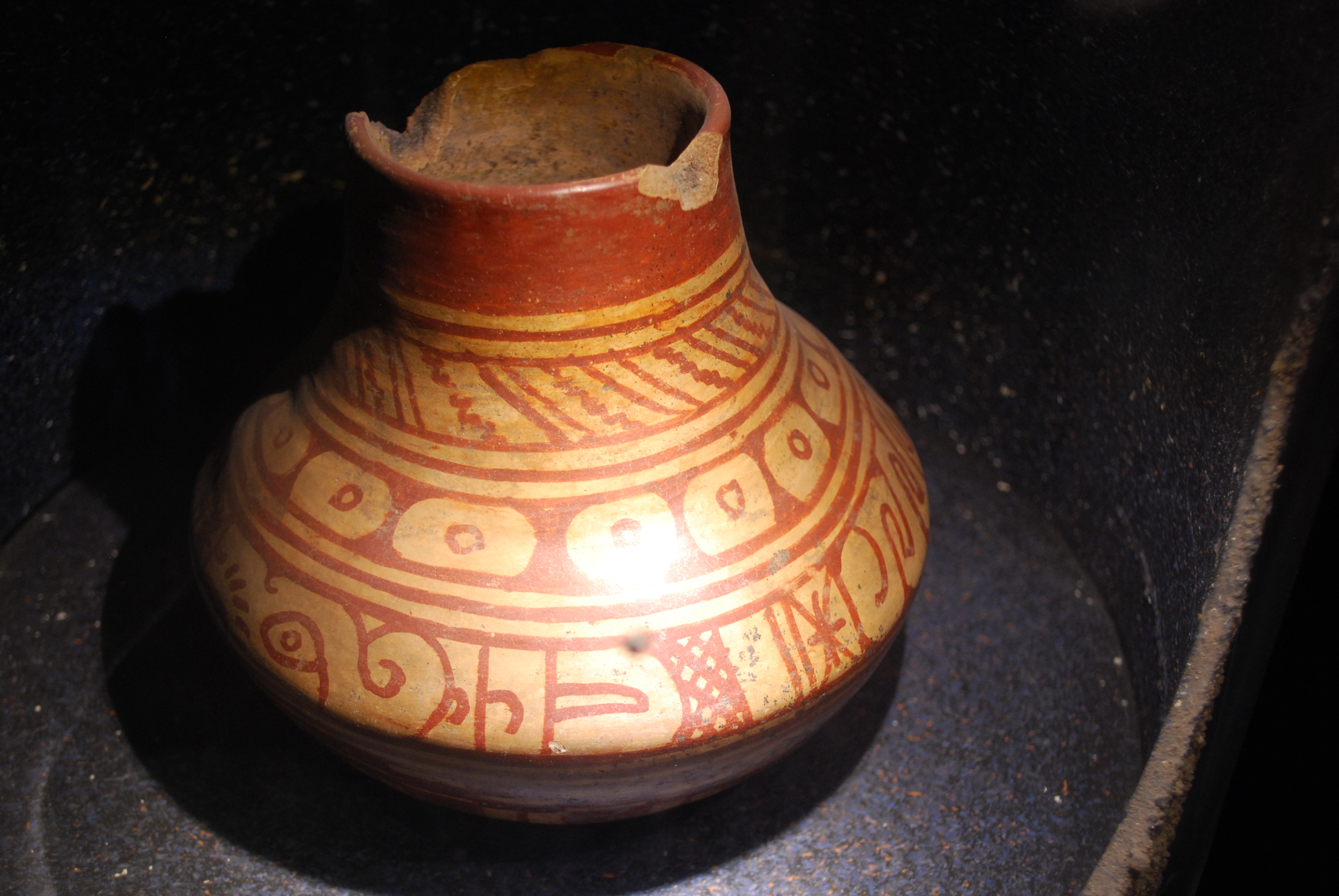

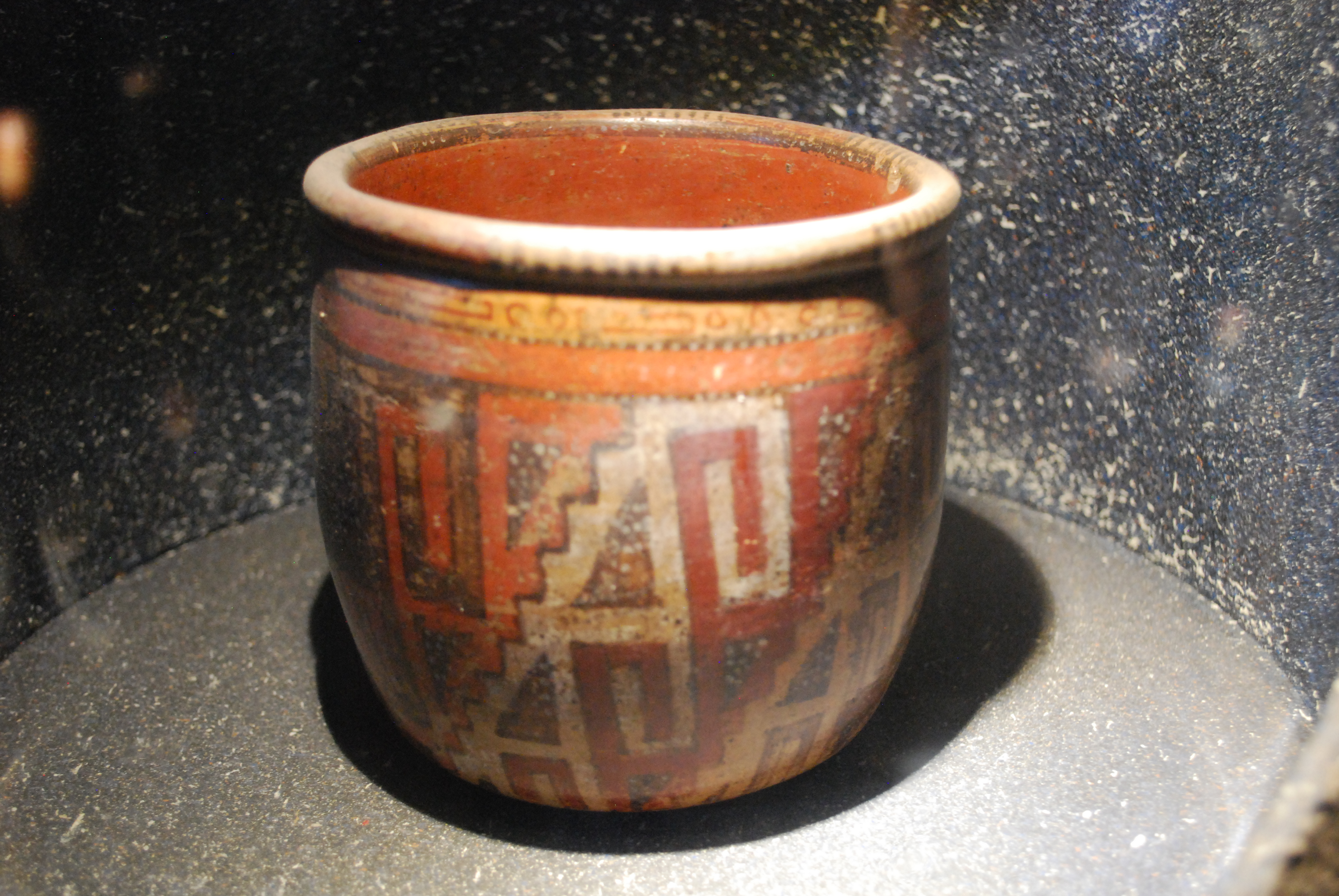

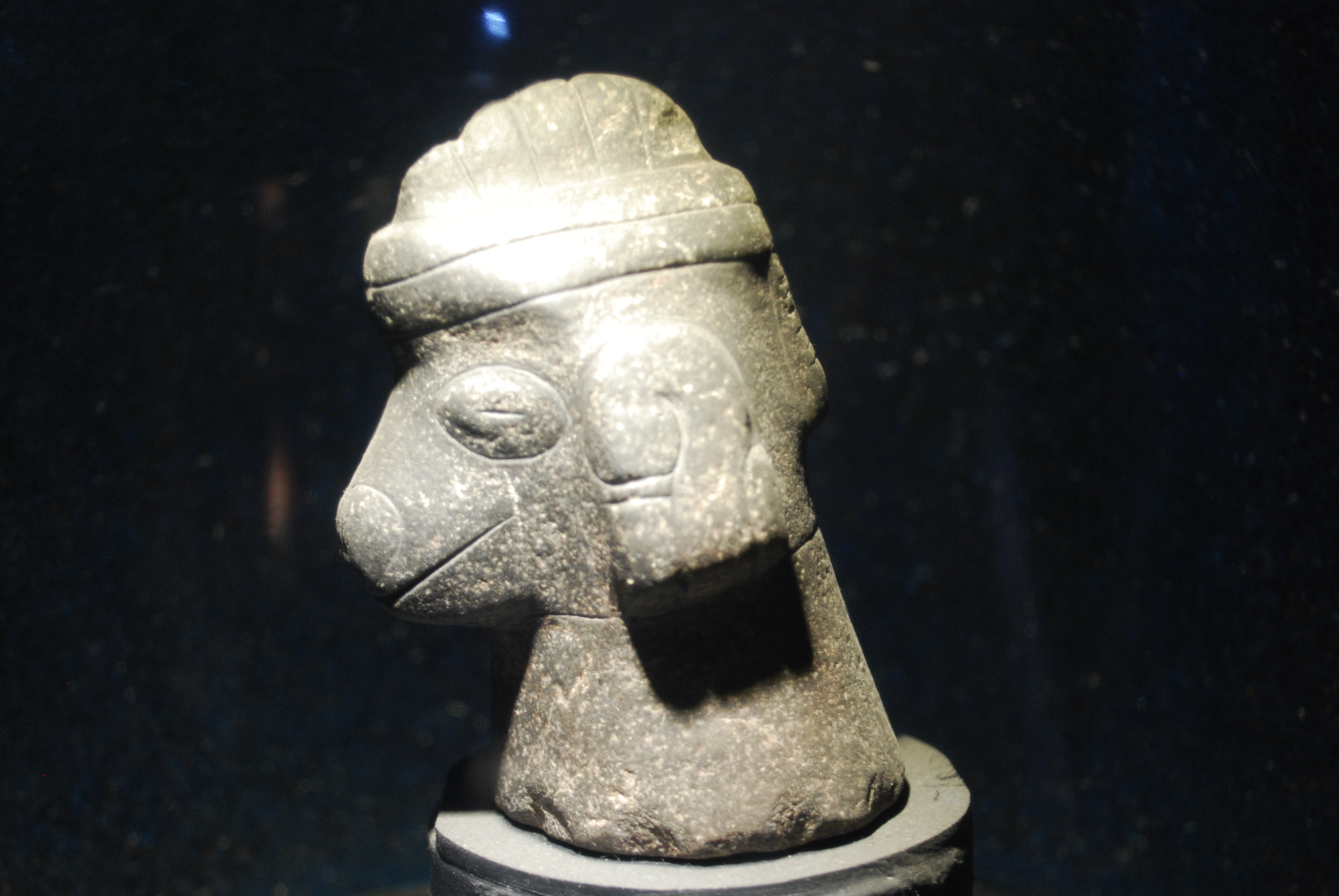

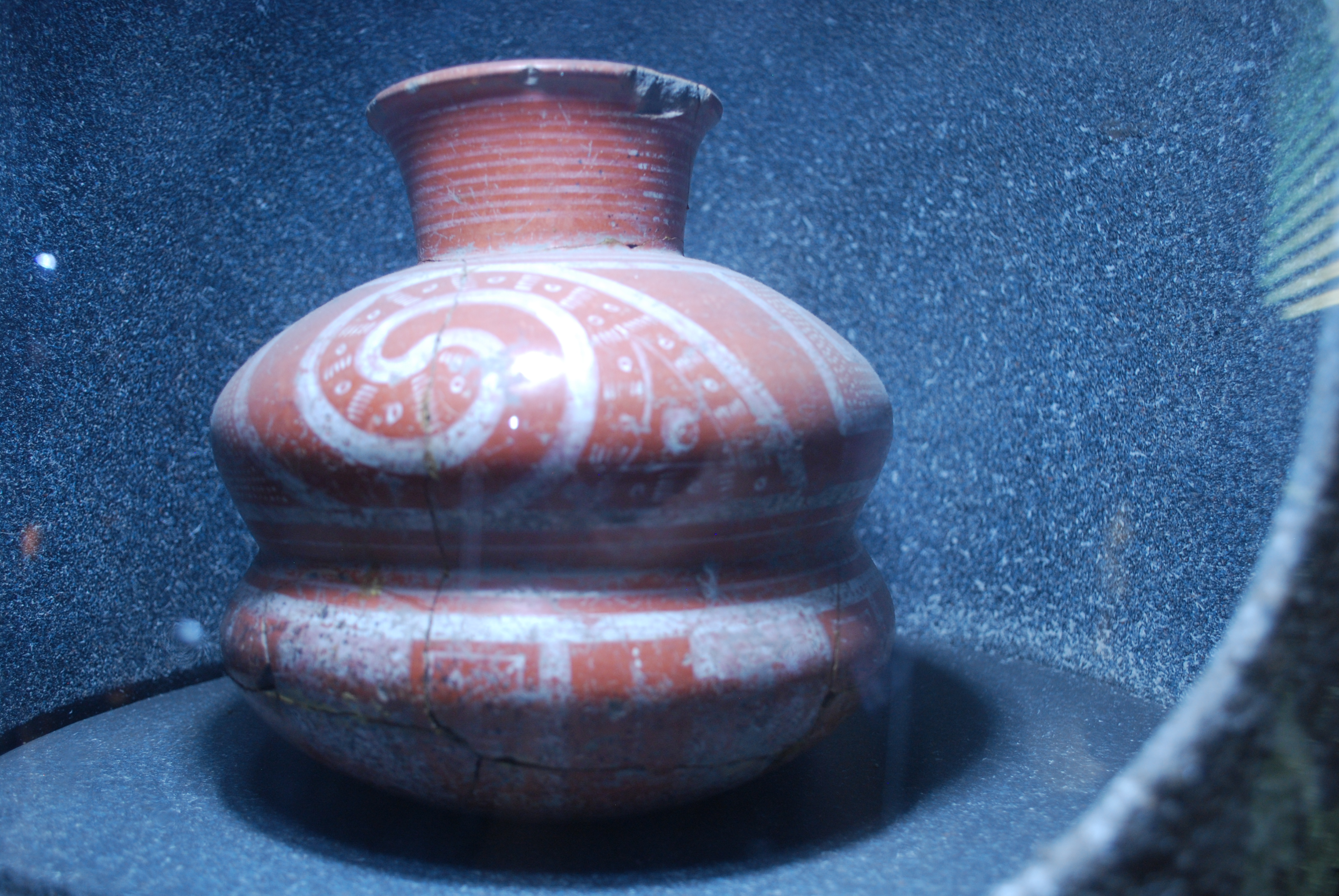

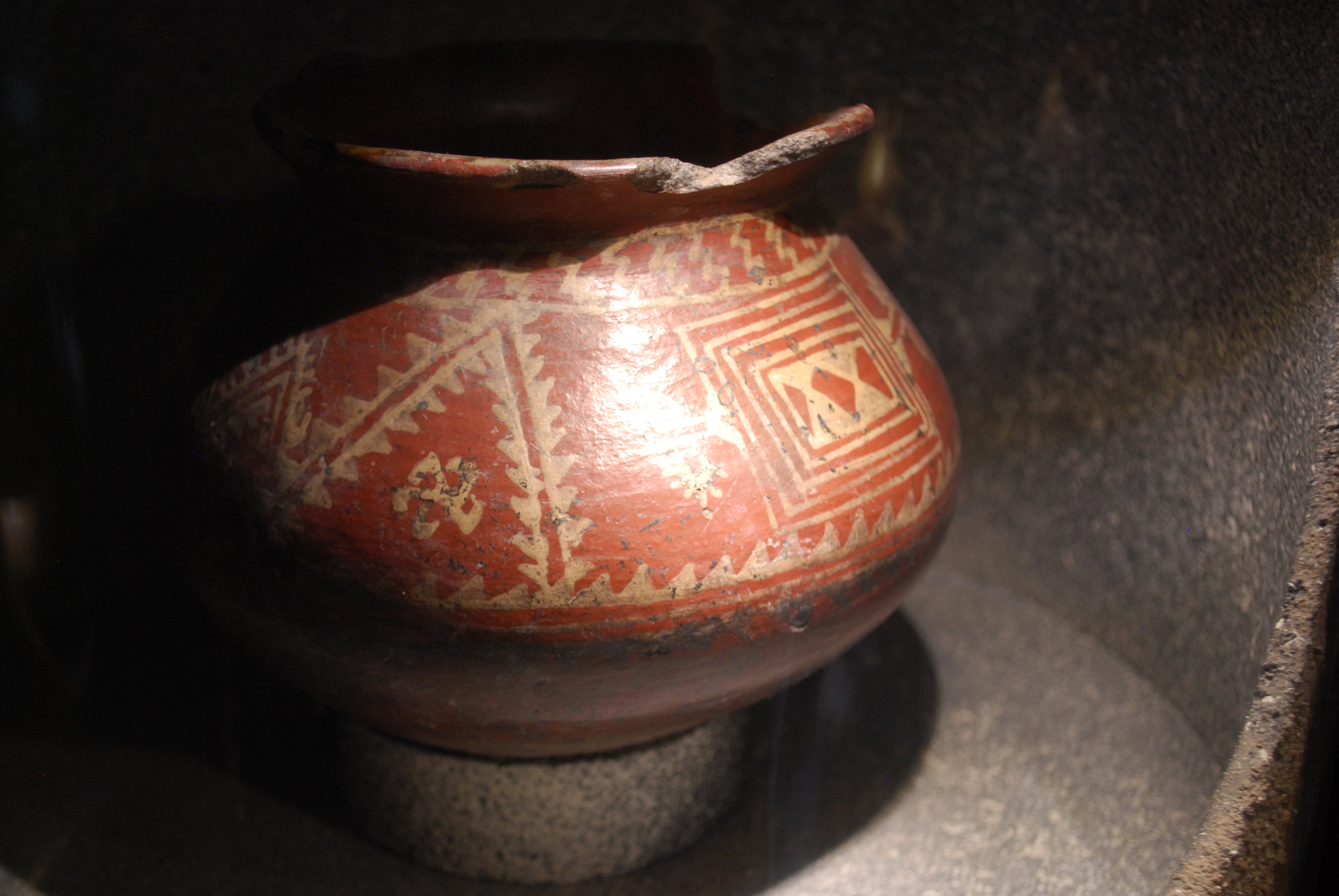
