= Alejandro Peschard Fernández =

Mexican archaeologist

Alejandro Alberto Peschard Fernández
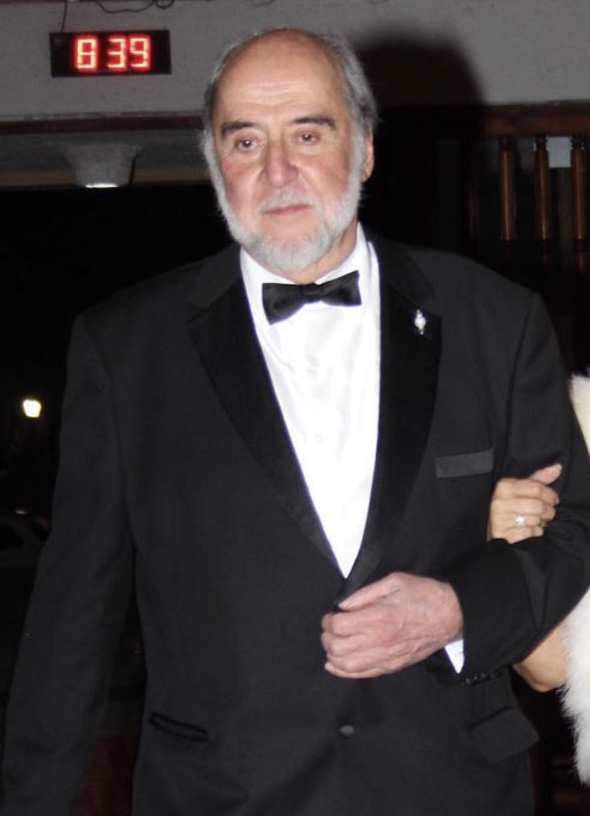
- Born: Durango City, Durango, Mexico
- Known for: Archaeology; Indigenous peoples of the Americas
- Scientific career
- Workplaces: Ganot-Peschard Museum of Archeology

Alejandro Peschard Fernández is a Mexican archaeologist, writer, and doctor from Durango. He has written several monographs on the history of the indigenous peoples of Northern Mexico, and in 1998, he founded the Museo de Arqueología Ganot-Peschard with his colleague Jaime Ganot Rodríguez.

The museum's collection primarily consists of archeological evidence collected by Peschard and Ganot over the course of 30 years of research in Zacatecas, Sinaloa, Nayarit, and Jalisco.

== Ganot-Peschard Museum of Archaeology ==
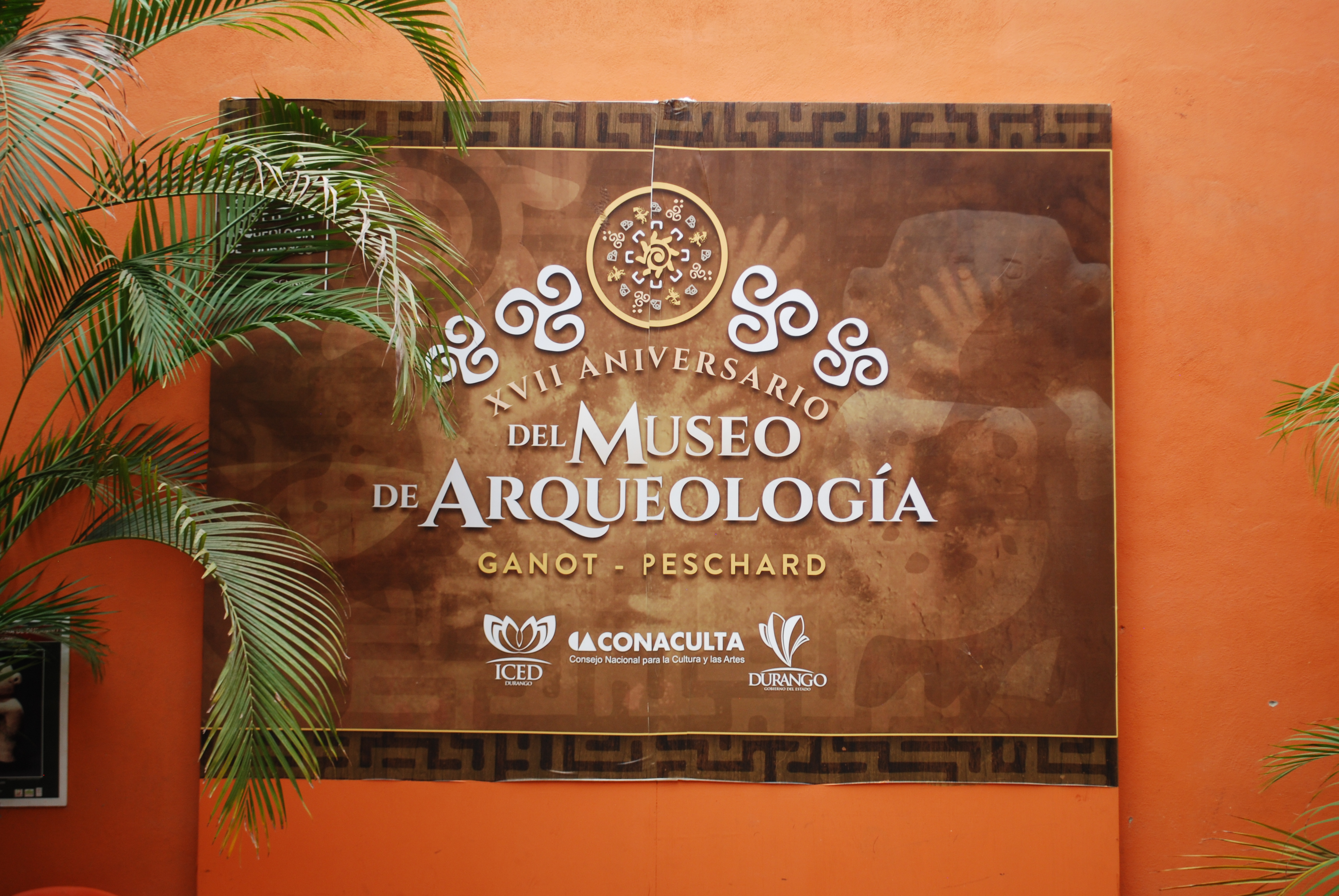
Ganot-Peschard Museum entry.

The Ganot-Peschard Museum of Archaeology is located in Zona Centro of Durango. It is housed in a historic building, which at various points held a printing press and the Durango state archives. Operating since 1998, the museum has been recognized by the National Institute of Anthropology and History as a culturally significant landmark.

Oriented toward preserving the archeological heritage of Northern Mexico, Peschard has served as the director of the museum since its founding.

== Archeological Work ==
Much of Peschard's work has focused on indigenous material culture and practices in Northern Mexico. His work on Tepehuan solar alignments in ceremonial sites in Durango was noted in the 2008 text, Archaeology without Borders:

Not far from the Tepehuanes River in Durango is the small town of El Zape. Here is found a shelter with high, vertical walls where some type of solar ritual was held. Jaime Ganot Rodríguez and Alejandro Peschard Fernández... have studied this ceremonial site and identified a solar alignment on the spring equinox.

== Published works ==
- Las Poblaciones Indígenas de Durango a Través de la Historia en Busca de la Identidad Regional de Durango (Gobierno del Estado de Durango, Secretaría de Educación, Cultura y Deporte, 2000), ISBN 9789709046106
- Aztatlán: Apuntes para la Historia y Arqueología de Durango (Gobierno del Estado de Durango, Secretaría de Educación, Cultura y Deporte, 1997), ISBN 978-9686466997
- "Cosmic ideograms on petroglyphs of the Mesoamerican cultures of 'El Zape' region in Durango, Mexico" in World Archaeoastronomy (Cambridge University Press, 1989), ISBN 978-0521341806
