= La Ferrería =

Archaeological site in Durango, Mexico

La Ferrería Archaeological site
- Interactive map of La Ferrería Archaeological site
- 23°57′39″N 104°38′55″W
- Type: Mesoamerican archaeology
- Periods: Mesoamerican Classical - Postclassical
- Cultures: Chichimec - Chalchihuites
- Location: City of Durango, Durango, Mexico

History
- Built: 875- 1450 CE

Site notes
- Website: La Ferrería Archaeological site

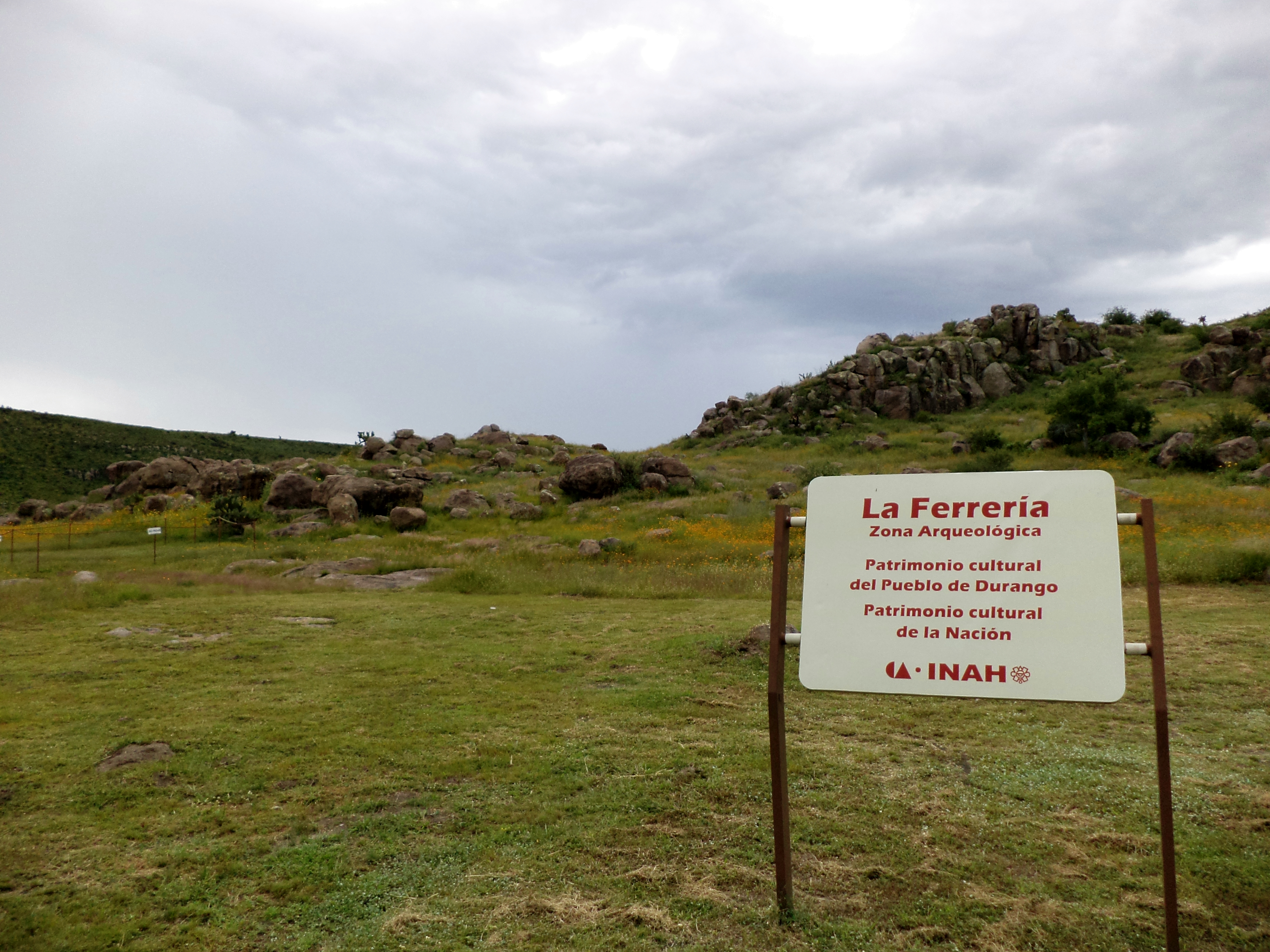

La Ferrería is an archaeological site located 7 kilometers south of the city of Durango, in the Mexican state of Durango, at the “Cerro de La Ferrería”, on the side of the Tunal River.

In the surrounding region mainly are Mesquite and Aloe, the fauna comprises hares, rabbits, foxes, coyotes, squirrel and lizards.

The first inhabitants of this region were Nahua, nomads from the North of the continent, two thousand years ago. During the postclassical period the city was occupied by Zacatecas people and their contemporaries tepehuanos, from the southeast of the Guadiana Valley up to “Nombre de Dios”.

La Ferrería was first inhabited by a group that basically subsisted from farming corn, beans and squash, and were hunter-gatherers to complete their diet; because of its proximity to the Tunal river, it is assumed that hunting and fishing were common activities. It has been detected that the site was occupied several times between 875 and 1450 CE.

The site includes archaeological finds such as: circular ritual spaces, bird bones and stone rings, that provide indications of ties with cultures of the American southwest and especially with Paquimé, which could hypothetically mean or suggest a fusion between late northern Mesoamerican cultures and the American southwest.

== Background ==
Hohokam – Mogollón – Anasazi Influence Areas

The first settlers who were in La Ferrería are known as the Nahuas who were in her in the 600 A.D. and they migrated from around North America. Also from 600 C.E. to 1450 C.E. the tribes who were in this place were known as the Zacatecan and Tepehuano Indian tribes. The Ferrería was also known as a place where people meet to have a religious gathering at which they built pyramids, places of worship and houses. Also in 2007, a museum near La Ferrería was remodeled and it contains archaeological artifacts that have been discovered there for people to go see. This broad area represents the natural corridor that the Sierra Madre Occidental offered to the Toltec and Nahuatlaca tribes, both of whom took advantage of the large accidental stone conformations to survive in the wilderness of the territory. The new formations formed as the only security for the tribes that moved among Northern Mexico and the Valley of Anahuac, eventually becoming a home-state for these tribes who then began to form small communities, united by language and region.

The Huichol, Cora, and Tarahumara Tepehuanos incorporated perfectly distinct nations, each with evident sedentary purposes, and a strong family structure, all whilst setting aside the bellicose attitude of the Chichimec tribe of the center of the then-current Republic. The exceptions were the Acaxee, Humas, and Xiximes who were constantly at war but always on the look-out for final settlements in the region of the Quebradas.

On the east bank of the state a longitudinal zone can be found, that extends from the current state of Zacatecas to the la Laguna area between the entities of Durango and Coahuila. The "Indios Laguneros" (Laguna Indians) traveled interchangeably between this area, they were characterized by their rebellious attitude, instability, religious customs and for being hunters and gatherers. These Natives of which so little was recorded were the first inhabitants of the region long before they were exterminated by the Spanish colonists. Today, only a few remain of the Tepehuanos, Huicholes, Coras and Tarahumara tribes.

There is an opinion which assumes that Mesoamerican cultures would have migrated northward. Hence Oasisamerica would be a branch of neighboring southerners. In that regard, the development of Oasisamerican cultures, such as those from northern Mesoamerica, would have been related to groups originally inhabiting western Mexico. Archaeological evidence suggests an affiliation with uto-nahua groups would have taken agriculture to the Oasisamerican region. Although agricultural techniques were imported from the south, Oasisamerican villages built a civilization with particular characteristics, that maintained relations with Mesoamerica farmers.

One must remember that Durango is at the south border of the Mogollon – Anasazi cultures influence area.

== Site investigation ==
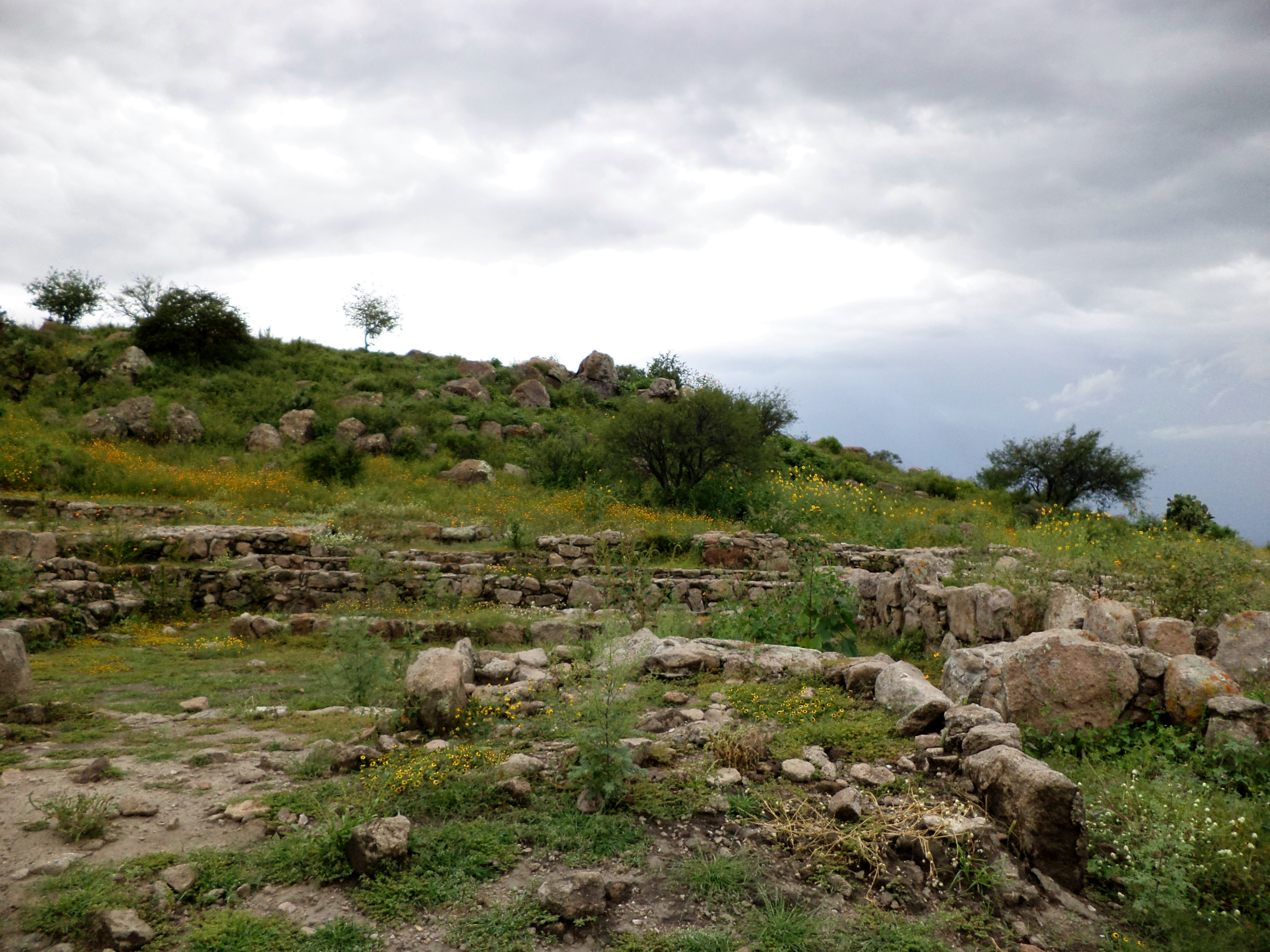
Ruins in the site

Spanish exploration began in 1531 with the Nuño de Guzmán expedition. In the following decades, especially under the command of Francisco de Ibarra, several settlements were founded in the territory and further north of the city of Zacatecas, when silver deposits were discovered. Ibarra named the new area Nueva Vizcaya in honor of his native land Biscay (one of the Basque historical territories). Nueva Vizcaya included the current states of Chihuahua and Durango, as well as certain areas of eastern Sonora and Sinaloa and southeast of Coahuila. The region fell under the legal jurisdiction of the “Royal Guadalajara Audiencia”.

The first scientific news on this site was in 1948, by American anthropologist Alden Mason; four years later Charles Kelley, with a group of students from University of Chicago, started initial research work, from which he removed multiple archaeological pieces and prepared three essays.

The final disposition of archaeological material is unknown; however, these were used by Kelley to establish occupation periods and site characterization. A proposed occupation between 800 and 1450 CE, was established, and its possible affiliation with the Chalchihuites culture, Guadiana branch.

After Kelley research, the site was abandoned by the authorities for 40 years, with the consequent destruction and looting by professional dealers of archaeological pieces.

Since 1993 there have been a few sporadic investigations.

== The Site ==
The site has traces of at least two human groups occupation in the past, a nomad group that inhabited the site originally and a second group, sedentary, that built the larger structures on the hill.

The site occupation is related to Chalchihuites culture, that had its most important site in Altavista in the state of Zacatecas, formed part of a branch called Guadiana, that reached up to El Zape, in the north of the state.

The cultural group that inhabited La Ferrería basically subsisted farming corn, beans and squash, and were hunter-gatherers.

=== Structures ===
There are important archaeological complexes, among them: circular ritual spaces, eastern pyramidal structure, ballgame court, columns and sunken patios.

==== Casa de la estructuras escalonadas ====
The "stepped structures house" is a small set with a sunken patio, characteristic detailed of prehispanic construction in the region; there are platforms on three sides of the patio, built with stone and clay, probably as a foundation of other ancient structures. Grinding activities were conducted in this area.

==== Casa de los dirigentes ====
It is thought that the “Governor’s House” structure had residential uses, has a sunken patio carved in large rocks. There are remains of buildings perimeter as well as original drains.

Just as other structures, platforms surround it, probably foundations of houses made with tree trunk columns and grass roofs. These buildings are adjacent to the columns hall and the small house.

==== Sala de las columnas ====
The “columns hall” are remnants of a small platform made of stone with large cylindrical columns, probably a meeting place, possibly ritual character.

==== Casa colonial ====
The “colonial house” is next to the columns hall, are the foundations of a small, rustic house possibly colonial; It is a single room house, with evidence of metal foundry.

==== Casa con piso de piedra ====
The “house with stone floors” is located at the top, it is necessary to climb the hill over an original pathway. There are two fixed mortars, probably from a nomadic group occupation, possibly reused by the later farmers groups.

At the House, at the middle of the slope is a small sunken patio, one side was carved into the rock, forming two walls and the floor. In one corner is a fixed mortar.

==== Casa de los sacerdotes ====
The “Priests House” has remains of houses layout, a cistern and several drainage channels of a pyramidal basement, probably a temple support, this structure is austere; had stairs and ramps, as well as a small sunken patio in the top.

==== Ballgame court ====
It is one of the most damaged structures at the site; it comprises two stone parallel walls, of a construction that seems to be a ritual ballgame court. There are stone two stools inside, a platform, probably of large dimensions.

=== Petroglyphs ===
There are two large engraved rocks:

One of them depicts a small image that represents a priest with the arms high and wears a ceremonial ornament with antlers. The rock was partially polished and is the focal point of a small area dedicated to the cult, may be considered the place of protective deities.

The second is located at the foot of the hill, it is very deteriorated, a hunting scene can be identified, a man with a bow, associated with two mammals.

=== Others Objects ===
Several objects were found on the site: pieces of ceramic, complete lithic pieces such as arrowheads, axes and mortars.

== Site Museum ==
The Museum was inaugurated in 2000. It has two exhibition halls of archaeological materials from La Ferrería, the chalchihuites culture, from the ritual everyday life, relations with other peoples and the archaeological work in the area.

There is ceramic with abstract decorations, Catalan-style red band and some ceramic boxes. Large pots which served for burials and Obsidian knives.

== See also ==
- City of Durango
- State of Durango
- Altavista (Zacatecas)
- Oasisamerica
