= Catholic Church in Mexico =

- Spanish: Iglesia Católica en México; Latin: Ecclesia Catholica in Mexico
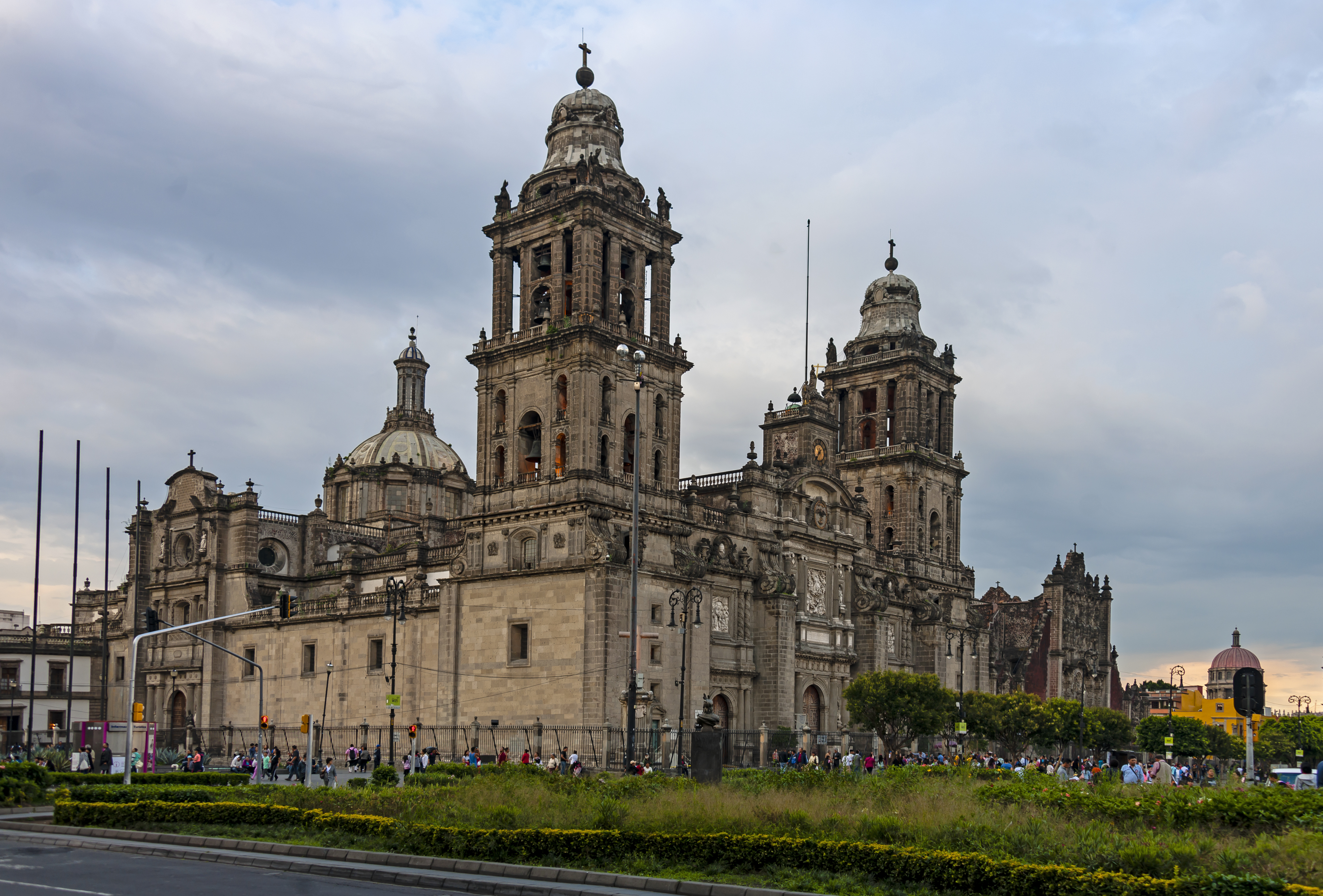
- The Mexico City Metropolitan Cathedral.
- Type: National polity
- Classification: Catholic
- Orientation: Latin & Eastern
- Scripture: Bible
- Theology: Catholic theology
- Polity: Episcopal
- Governance: CEM
- Pope: Leo XIV
- President: Francisco Robles Ortega
- Region: Mexico
- Language: Spanish, Latin
- Headquarters: Mexico City
- Founder: Juan de Zumárraga
- Origin: Early 16th Century; New Spain, Spanish Empire
- Separations: Protestantism in Mexico
- Members: 97,864,220 (2020)
- Official website: CEM

The Mexican Catholic Church, or Catholic Church in Mexico, is part of the worldwide Catholic Church, under the spiritual leadership of the Pope, his Curia in Rome, and the national Mexican Episcopal Conference. According to the Mexican census, Roman Catholicism is the dominant religion in Mexico, practiced by 77.7 percent of the population in 2020. A Statistica survey suggests this number could be a little lower, suggesting Catholics could make up 72 percent of the nation.

The history of the Catholic Church in Mexico dates from the period of the Spanish conquest of the Aztec Empire (1519–1521) and it has continued as an institution in Mexico into the twenty-first century. In the late 20th century, Eastern Catholic jurisdictions were also established in Mexico.

In many parts of the country, Catholic Christianity is heavily syncretized with folk customs, as well as Aztec, Mayan, and other Mesoamerican religions.

== History ==
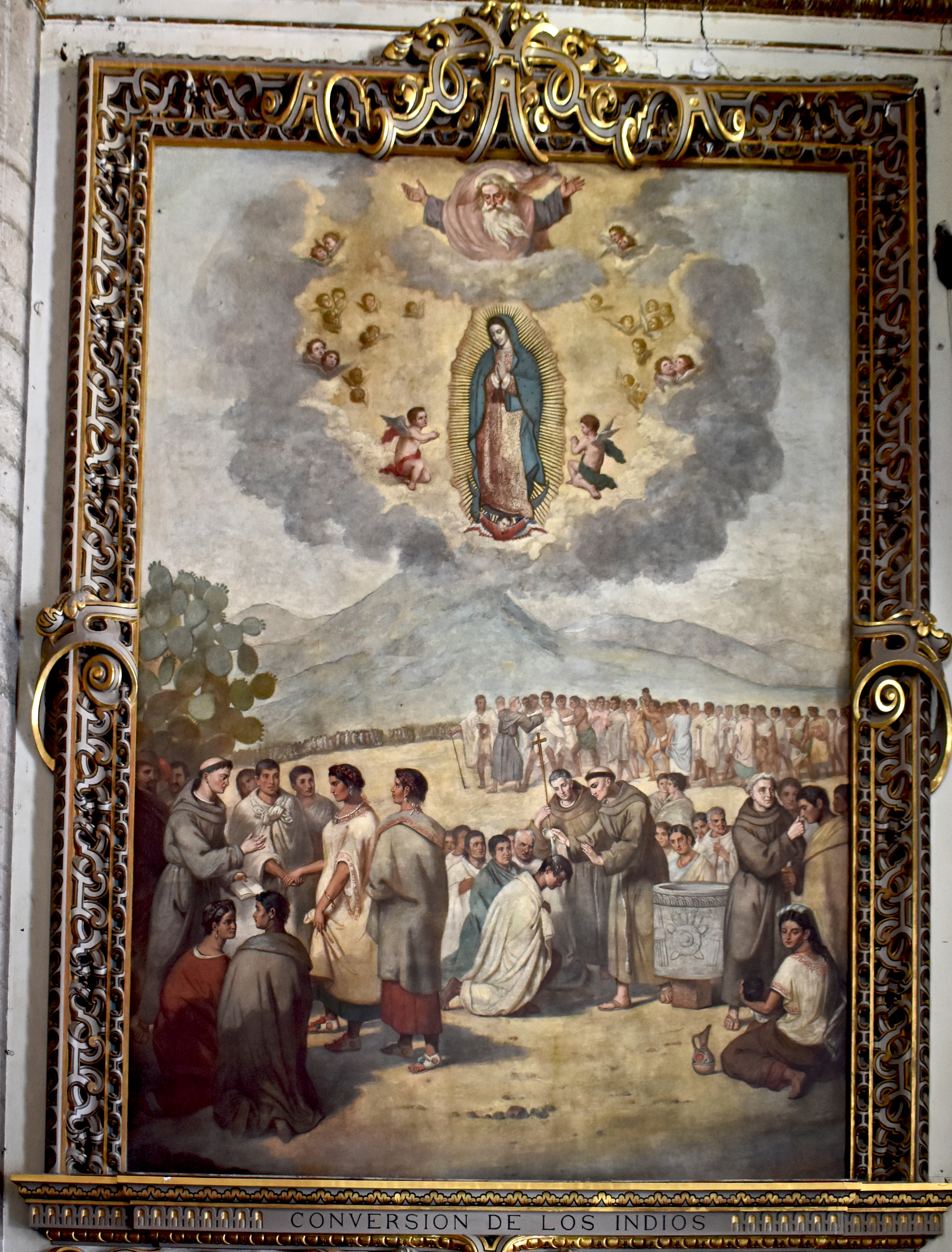
La conversion des Indiens (The conversion of the Indians). Felipe Santiago Gutiérrez, 1894.

The history of the Catholic Church in Mexico can be divided into distinct periods, the basic division being between colonial Mexico, known as New Spain and the national period, from Mexican independence in 1821 until the current era.

The era of the military conquest in the early sixteenth century saw the Church's huge effort to evangelize the indigenous population of Mexico in what is termed "the spiritual conquest". As the Spanish Empire expanded into new territories, the incorporation of the indigenous population was a priority for the crown. The growth of the Spanish and mixed-race urban population of Mexico prompted the establishment of the episcopal hierarchy, under the patronage of the monarch and the creation of dioceses in Mexico.

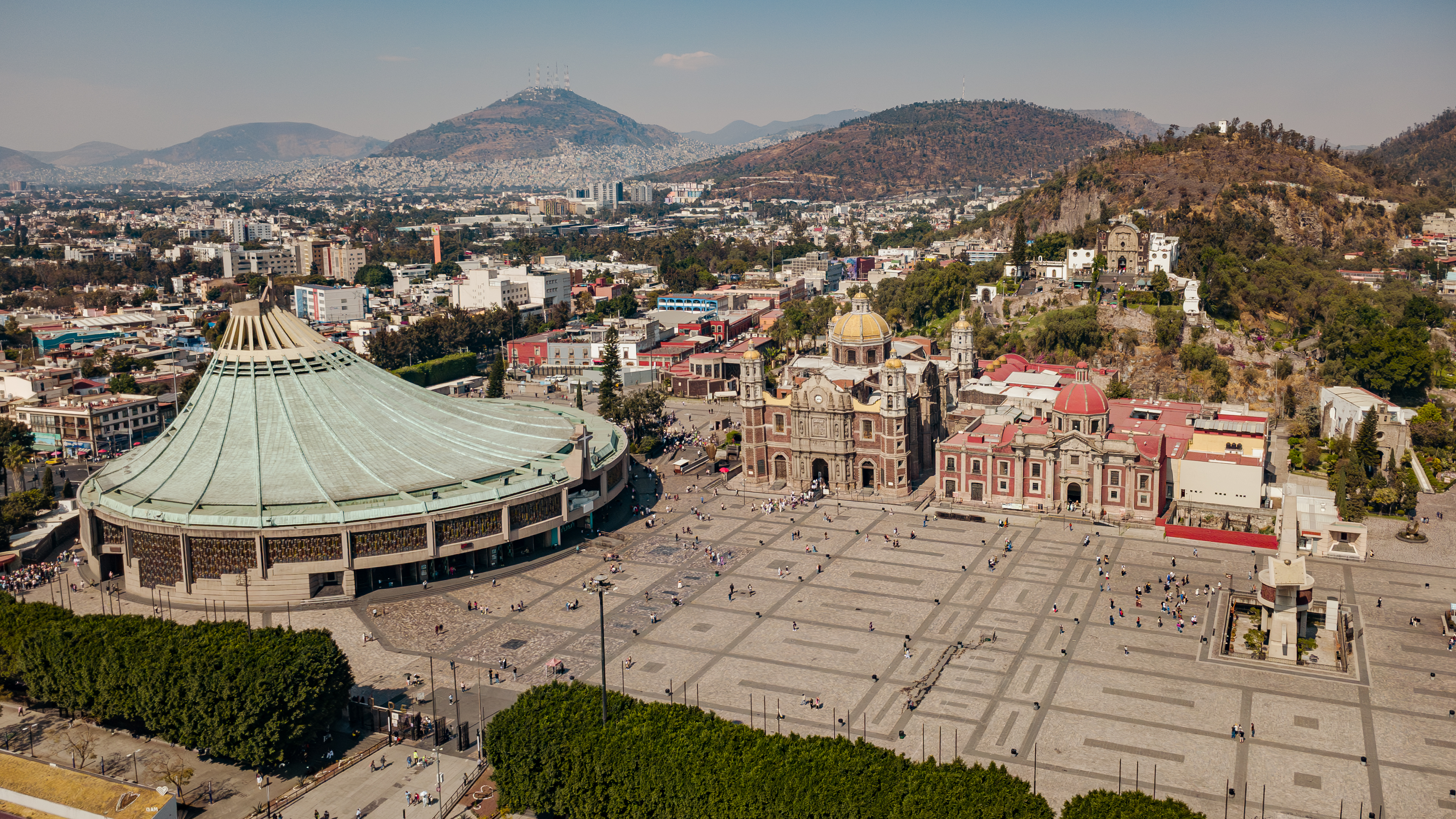
Basilica of Our Lady of Guadalupe

In the national period, following independence in early nineteenth century, Mexico established a legal framework that continued the privileged status of the Catholic Church as official and unique religion. La Reforma of the late 1850s sparked an extended period of violent conflict between the conservative supporters of the old order and liberals who sought to displace and diminish the power of the Church. The Mexican Revolution was won by largely anticlerical Constitutionalists and the Church's role in Mexico was restricted constitutionally.

After a period of violent open conflict over religious matters, Church-state relations returned to a modus vivendi while the anticlerical constitutional framework remained in place. Expansion of Catholic participation in the establishment of religious educational institutions and the creation of a conservative political party, the National Action Party, was an important characteristic of the late twentieth century. A new constitutional framework was created in 1992, which reiterated the separation between the Catholic Church and the state and lifted most but not all restrictions on religious freedom and the activities of the Catholic Church in Mexico.

== Organization ==
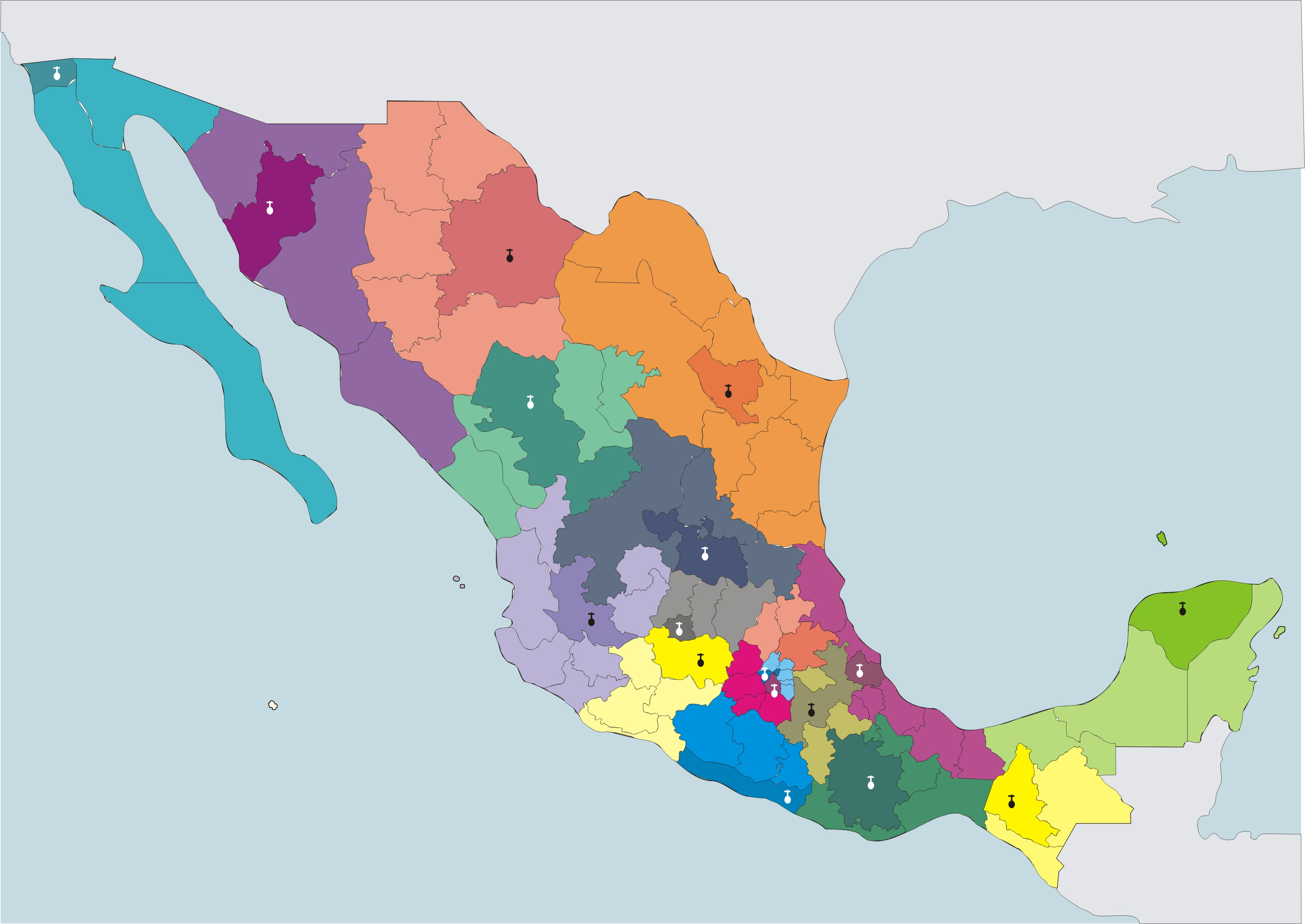
Map of diocese and the ecclesiastical provinces of Mexico updated to 2017.

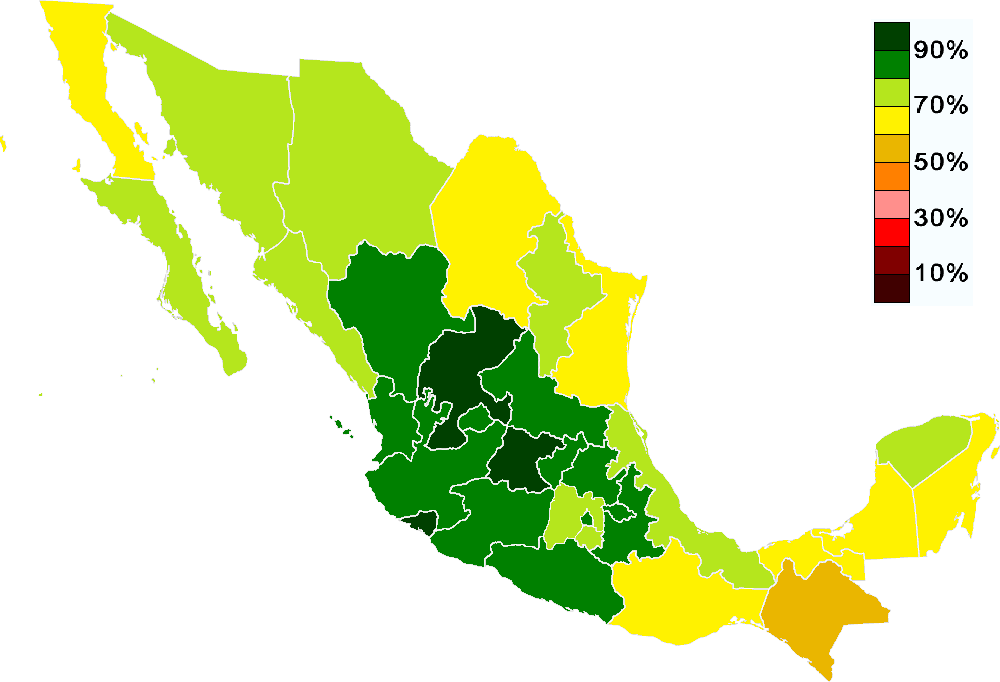
Map of the states of Mexico by percentage of Catholics.

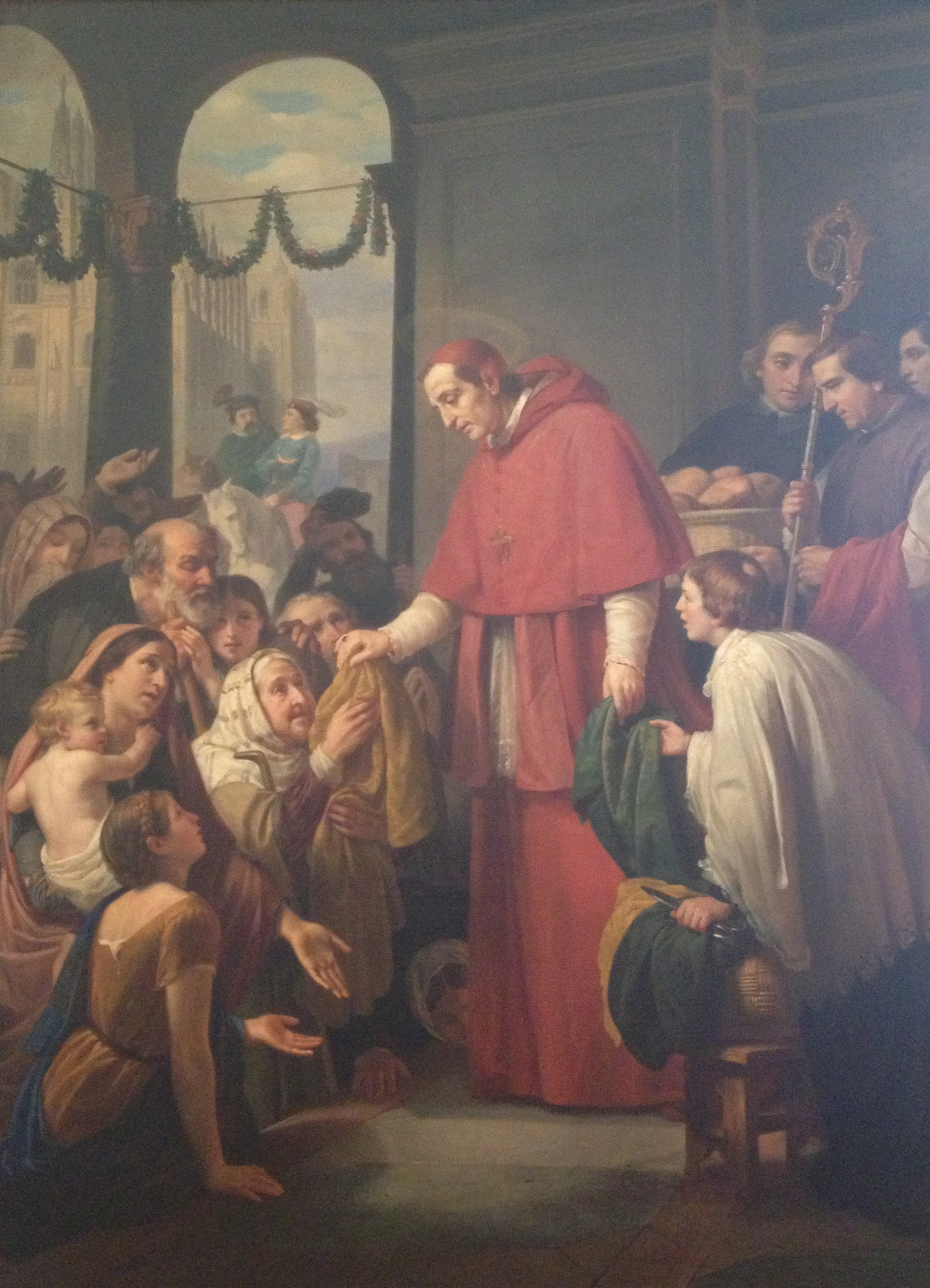
San Carlos Borromeo Repartiendo Limosna al Pueblo by Jose Salome Pina.

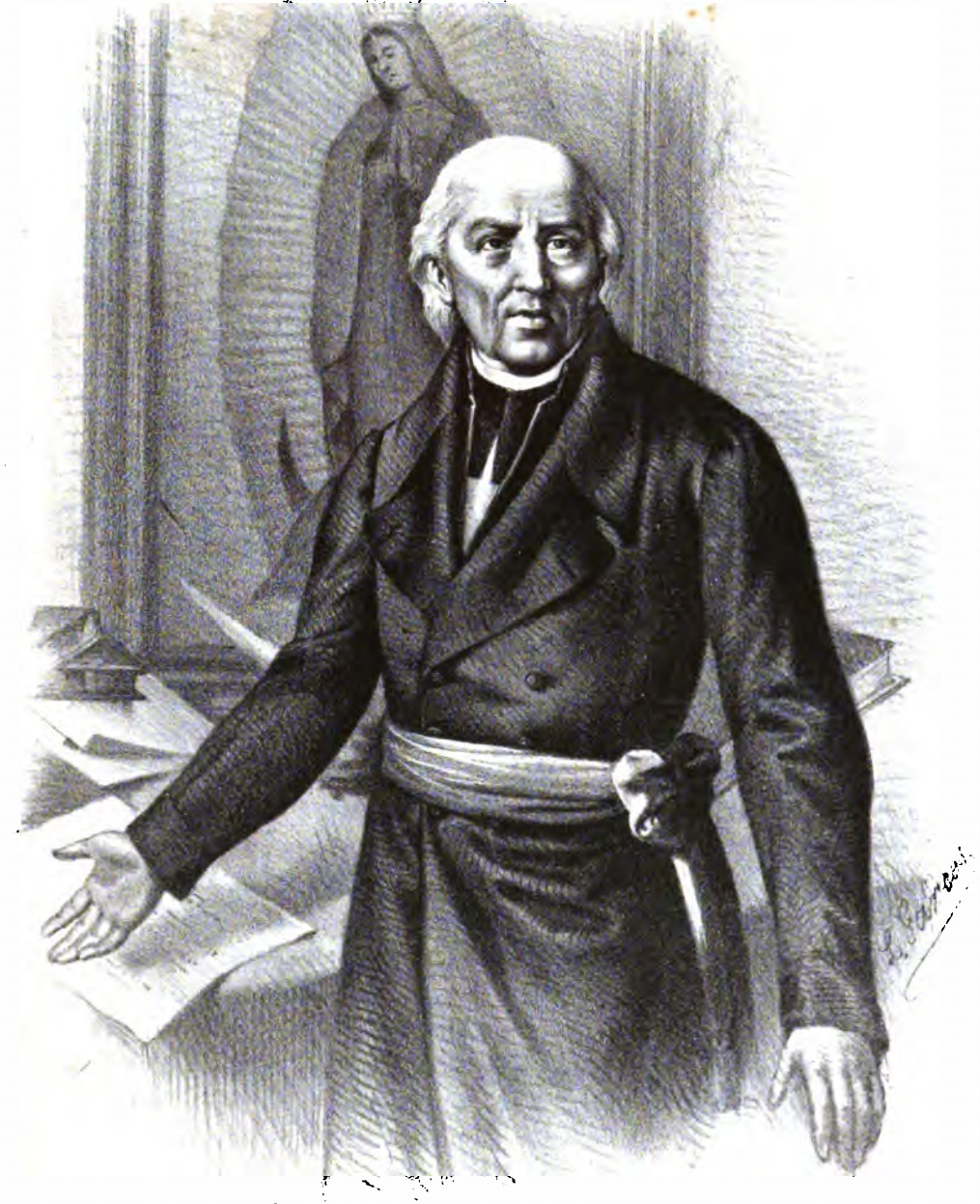
Miguel Hidalgo y Costilla with Our Lady of Guadalupe

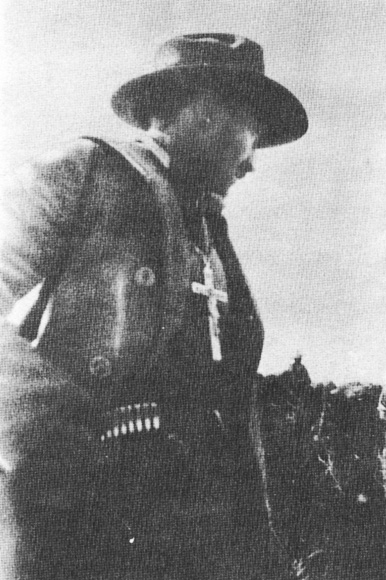
Enrique Gorostieta Velarde was a Mexican soldier best known for his leadership as a general during the Cristero War.

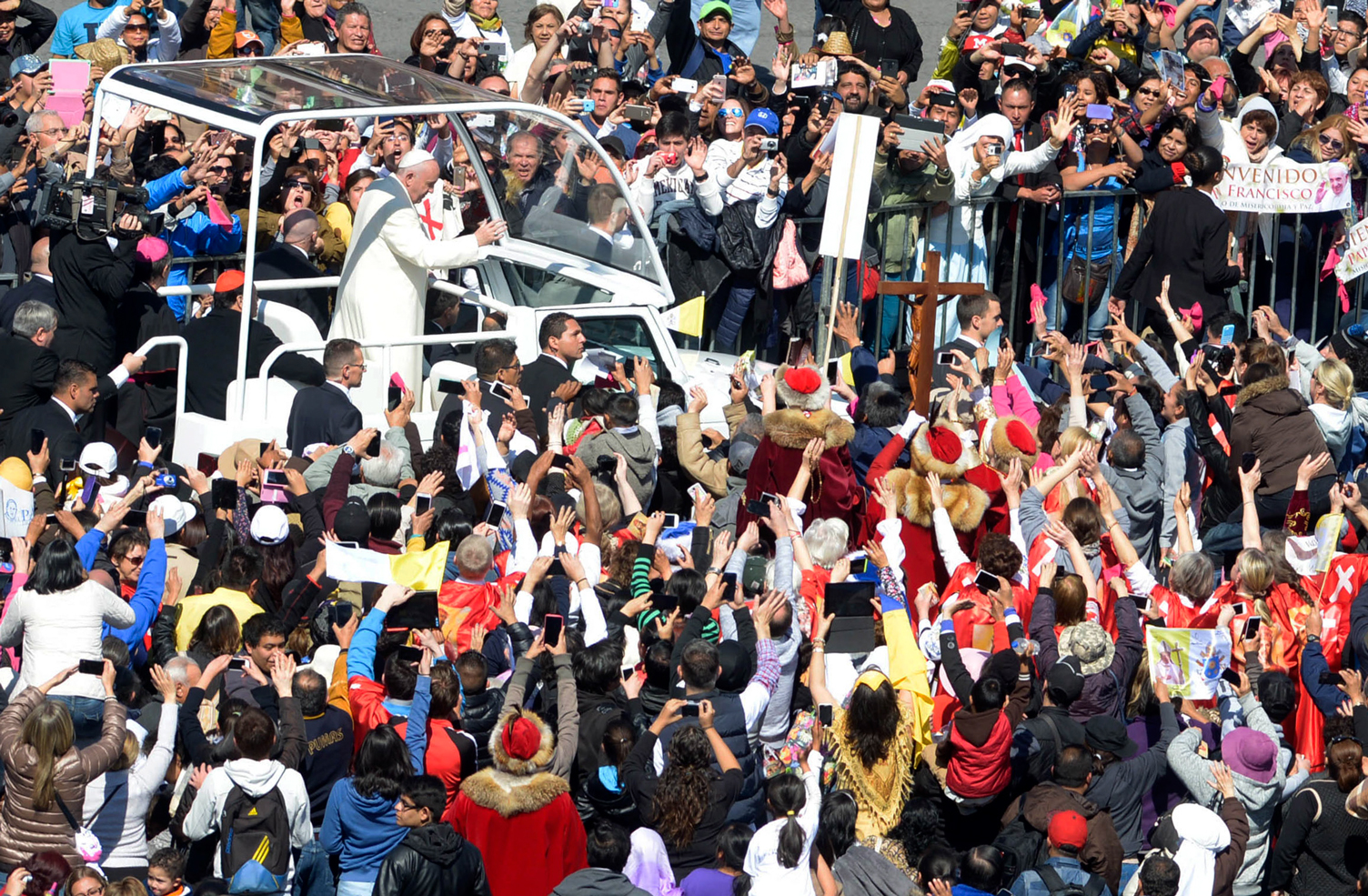
Pope Francis greets the faithful in the Zócalo during his visit to the Palacio Nacional as Head of State of the Holy See.

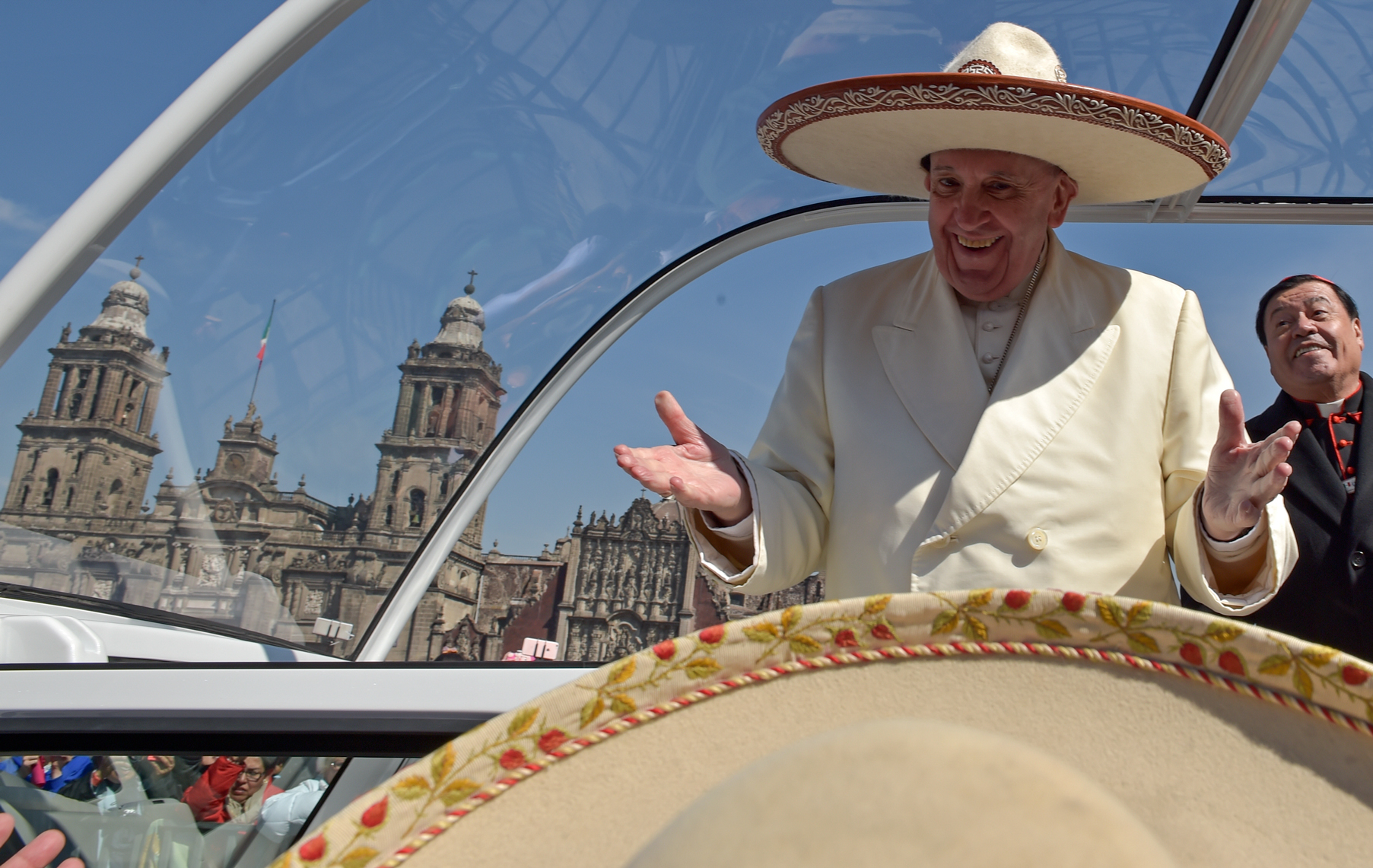
Pope Francis in Mexico City. February 13, 2016.

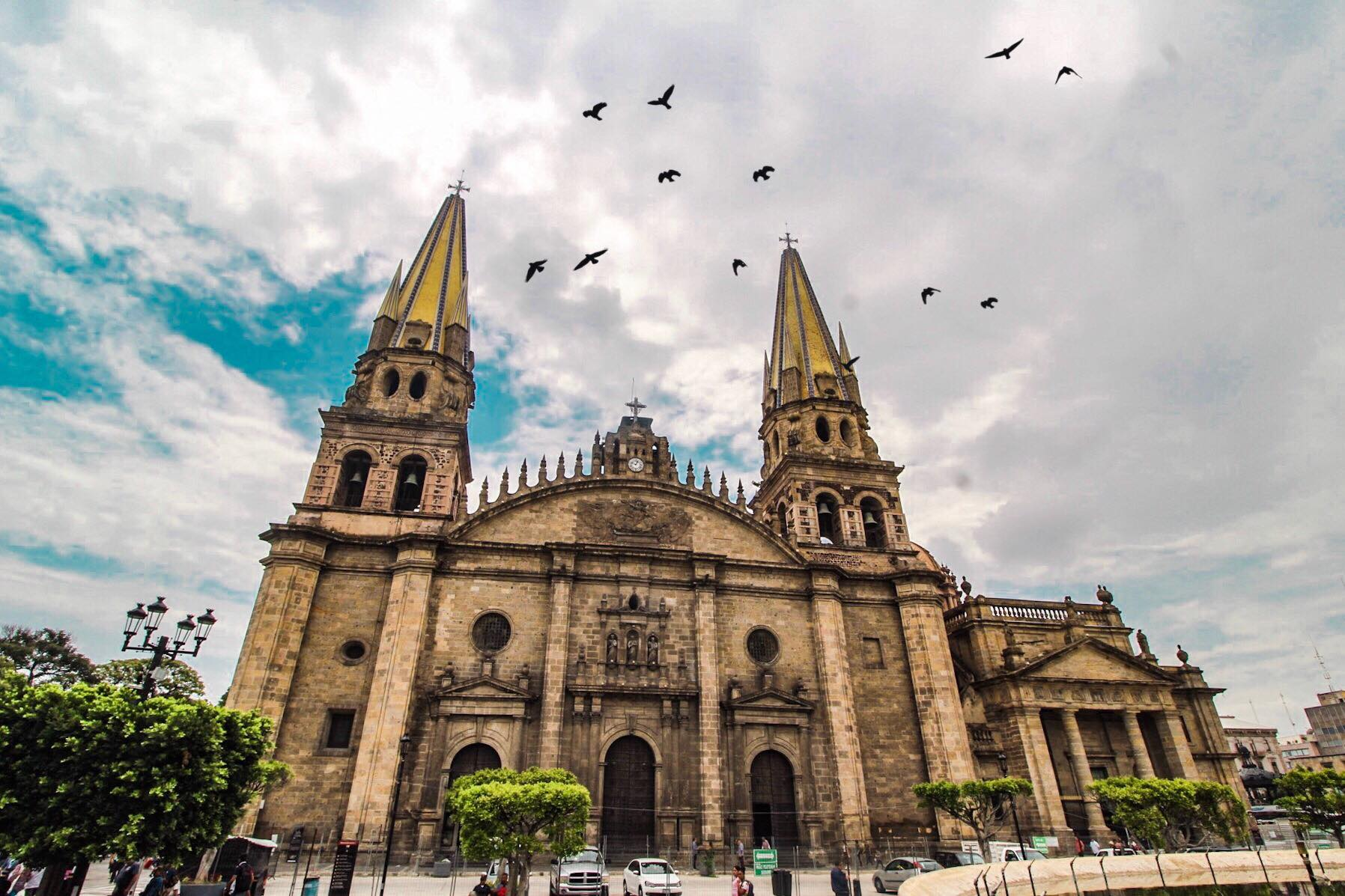
Guadalajara Cathedral

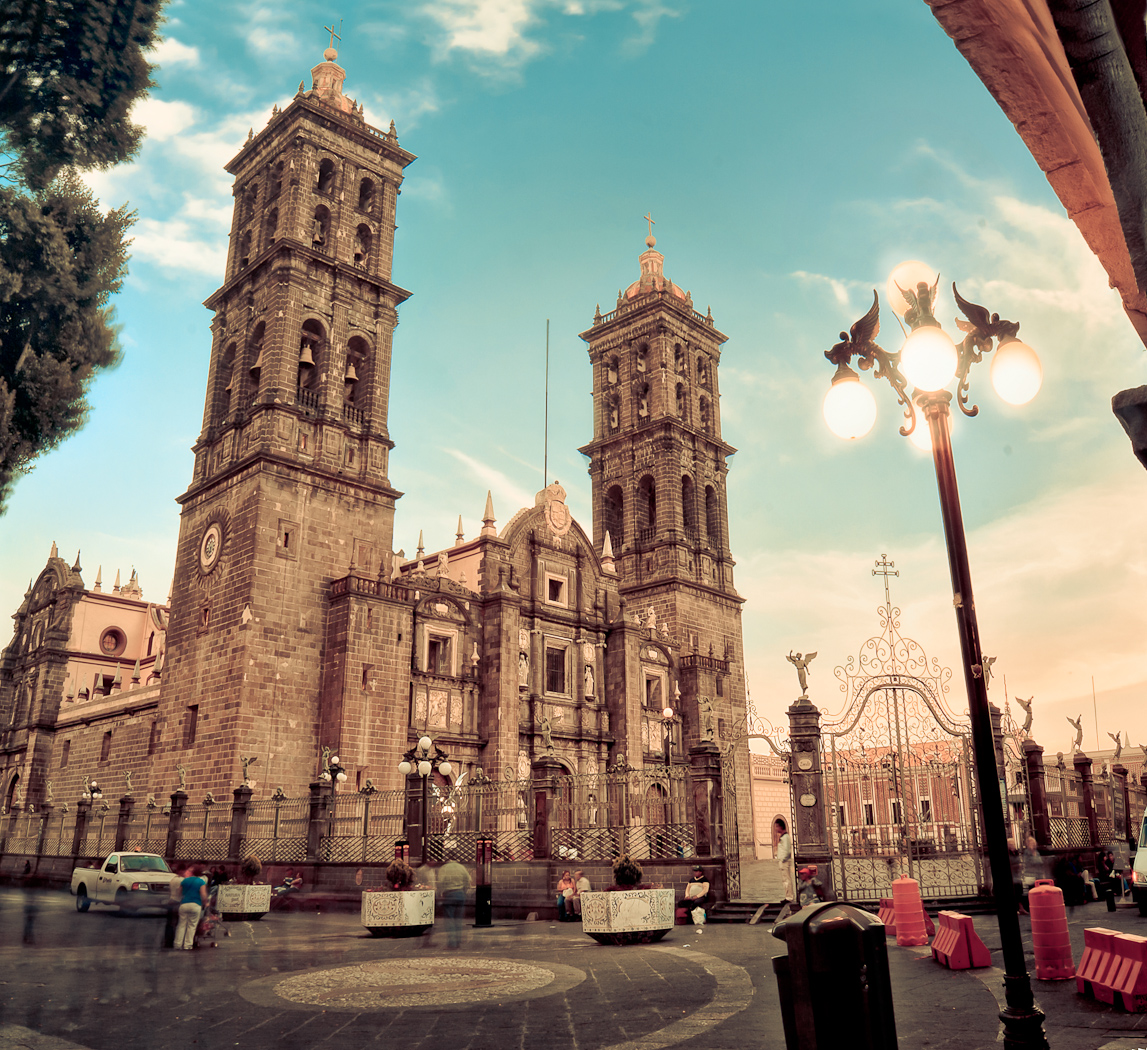
Puebla Cathedral

The Catholic Church is the world's largest Christian church, and its largest religious grouping. The 2020 census reported that Mexico had some 97,864,220 Catholics, which equates to approximately 78% of the total population, making it the second largest Catholic country in the world after Brazil. The country is divided into 18 Ecclesiastical provinces, containing a total of 90 dioceses. There are 15,700 diocesan priests and 46,000 men and women in religious orders.

=== Latin Church hierarchy ===
Mexico's ecclesiastical provinces were organized as follows, on 28 September 2019:

- Metropolitan Archdiocese of Acapulco
  - Diocese of Chilpancingo-Chilapa
  - Diocese of Ciudad Altamirano
  - Diocese of Tlapa
- Metropolitan Archdiocese of Antequera, Oaxaca
  - Diocese of Puerto Escondido
  - Diocese of Tehuantepec
  - Diocese of Tuxtepec
  - Prelature of Huautla
  - Prelature of Mixes
- Metropolitan Archdiocese of Chihuahua
  - Diocese of Ciudad Juárez
  - Diocese of Cuauhtémoc-Madera
  - Diocese of Nuevo Casas Grandes
  - Diocese of Parral
  - Diocese of Tarahumara
- Metropolitan Archdiocese of Durango
  - Diocese of Gómez Palacio
  - Diocese of Mazatlán
  - Diocese of Torreón
  - Prelature of El Salto
- Metropolitan Archdiocese of Guadalajara
  - Diocese of Aguascalientes
  - Diocese of Autlán
  - Diocese of Ciudad Guzmán
  - Diocese of Colima
  - Diocese of San Juan de los Lagos
  - Diocese of Tepic
  - Prelature of Jesús María
- Metropolitan Archdiocese of Hermosillo
  - Diocese of Ciudad Obregón
  - Diocese of Culiacán
  - Diocese of Nogales
- Metropolitan Archdiocese of Xalapa
  - Diocese of Coatzacoalcos
  - Diocese of Córdoba
  - Diocese of Orizaba
  - Diocese of Papantla
  - Diocese of San Andrés Tuxtla
  - Diocese of Tuxpan
  - Diocese of Veracruz
- Metropolitan Archdiocese of León
  - Diocese of Celaya
  - Diocese of Irapuato
  - Diocese of Querétaro
- Metropolitan Archdiocese of Mexico
  - Diocese of Azcapotzalco
  - Diocese of Iztapalapa
  - Diocese of Xochimilco
- Metropolitan Archdiocese of Monterrey
  - Diocese of Ciudad Victoria
  - Diocese of Linares
  - Diocese of Matamoros
  - Diocese of Nuevo Laredo
  - Diocese of Piedras Negras
  - Diocese of Saltillo
  - Diocese of Tampico
- Metropolitan Archdiocese of Morelia
  - Diocese of Apatzingan
  - Diocese of Ciudad Lázaro Cárdenas
  - Diocese of Tacámbaro
  - Diocese of Zamora
- Archdiocese of Puebla de los Angeles
  - Diocese of Huajuapan de León
  - Diocese of Tehuacán
  - Diocese of Tlaxcala
- Metropolitan Archdiocese of San Luis Potosí
  - Diocese of Ciudad Valles
  - Diocese of Matehuala
  - Diocese of Zacatecas
- Metropolitan Archdiocese of Toluca
  - Diocese of Atlacomulco
  - Diocese of Cuernavaca
  - Diocese of Tenancingo
- Metropolitan Archdiocese of Tijuana
  - Diocese of La Paz
  - Diocese of Mexicali
  - Diocese of Ensenada
- Metropolitan Archdiocese of Tlalnepantla
  - Diocese of Cuautitlán
  - Diocese of Ecatepec
  - Diocese of Izcalli
  - Diocese of Netzahualcóyotl
  - Diocese of Teotihuacan
  - Diocese of Texcoco
  - Diocese of Valle de Chalco
- Metropolitan Archdiocese of Tulancingo
  - Diocese of Huejutla
  - Diocese of Tula
- Metropolitan Archdiocese of Tuxtla Gutiérrez
  - Diocese of San Cristóbal de Las Casas
  - Diocese of Tapachula
- Metropolitan Archdiocese of Yucatán
  - Diocese of Campeche
  - Diocese of Tabasco
  - Prelature of Cancún-Chetumal

=== Eastern Catholic jurisdictions ===
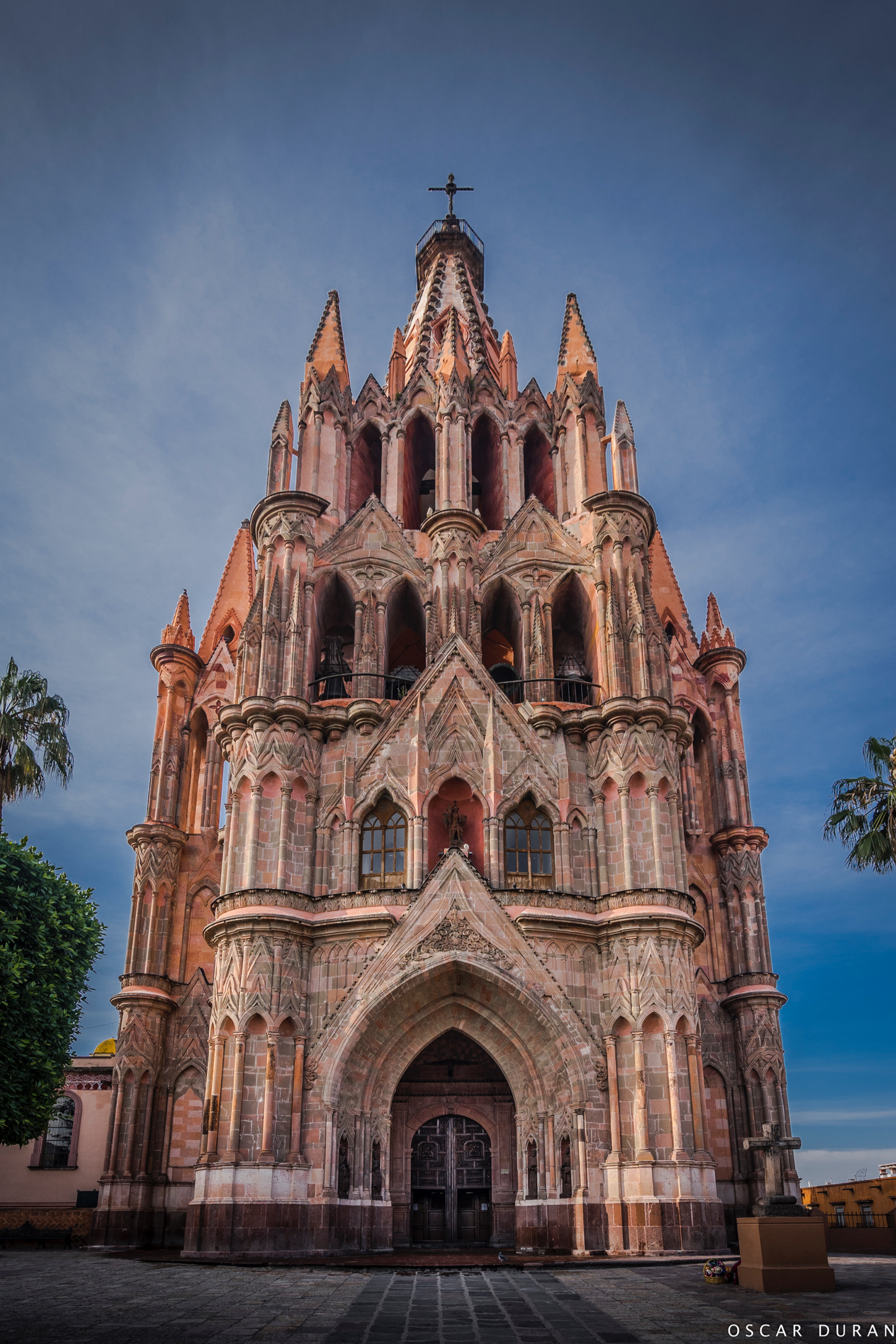
Parroquia de San Miguel Arcángel a prime example of Neo-Gothic architecture.

There are also separate jurisdictions for specific Eastern particular churches within the Catholic Church in Mexico:

- the Maronite Catholic Eparchy of Our Lady of the Martyrs of Lebanon in Mexico (from 1995, immediately subject to the Maronite Patriarch of Antioch)
- the Melkite Greek Catholic Eparchy of Nuestra Señora del Paraíso in Mexico City (from 1988, immediately subject to the Melkite Catholic Patriarch of Antioch)
- the Armenian Catholic Apostolic Exarchate of Latin America and Mexico (from 1981, exempt, i.e. directly subject to the Holy See) (No parish or cathedral in the entire country.)

=== Regular (monastic) Catholic Jurisdictions ===
- The Missionary Sons of the Immaculate Heart of Mary in Rome, The Claretian Order.

=== Prelates ===
José Garibi y Rivera was the first Mexican cardinal of the Catholic Church. Javier Lozano Barragán having served 10 years as a cardinal-deacon, was promoted to Cardinal Priest of Santa Dorotea by Pope Francis on 12 June 2014. Pope Francis selected 15 new cardinals for the Church in January 2015, one of whom was for Mexico in the archdiocese of Morelia. Alberto Suárez Inda is Morelia's first cardinal. According to an Associated Press story, he "has helped mediate political conflicts and kidnappings in one of Mexico's most violence-plagued states". On 7 December 2017, Pope Francis named Cardinal Carlos Aguiar Retes Archbishop of Mexico to succeed Norberto Rivera Carrera, "a pastor who had as many detractors as supporters" after 22 years in the post. His installation was scheduled for 5 February 2018. The Tablet said the appointment was not a surprise because Aguiar is "a towering ecclesial figure in Central and Latin America".

== Gallery ==
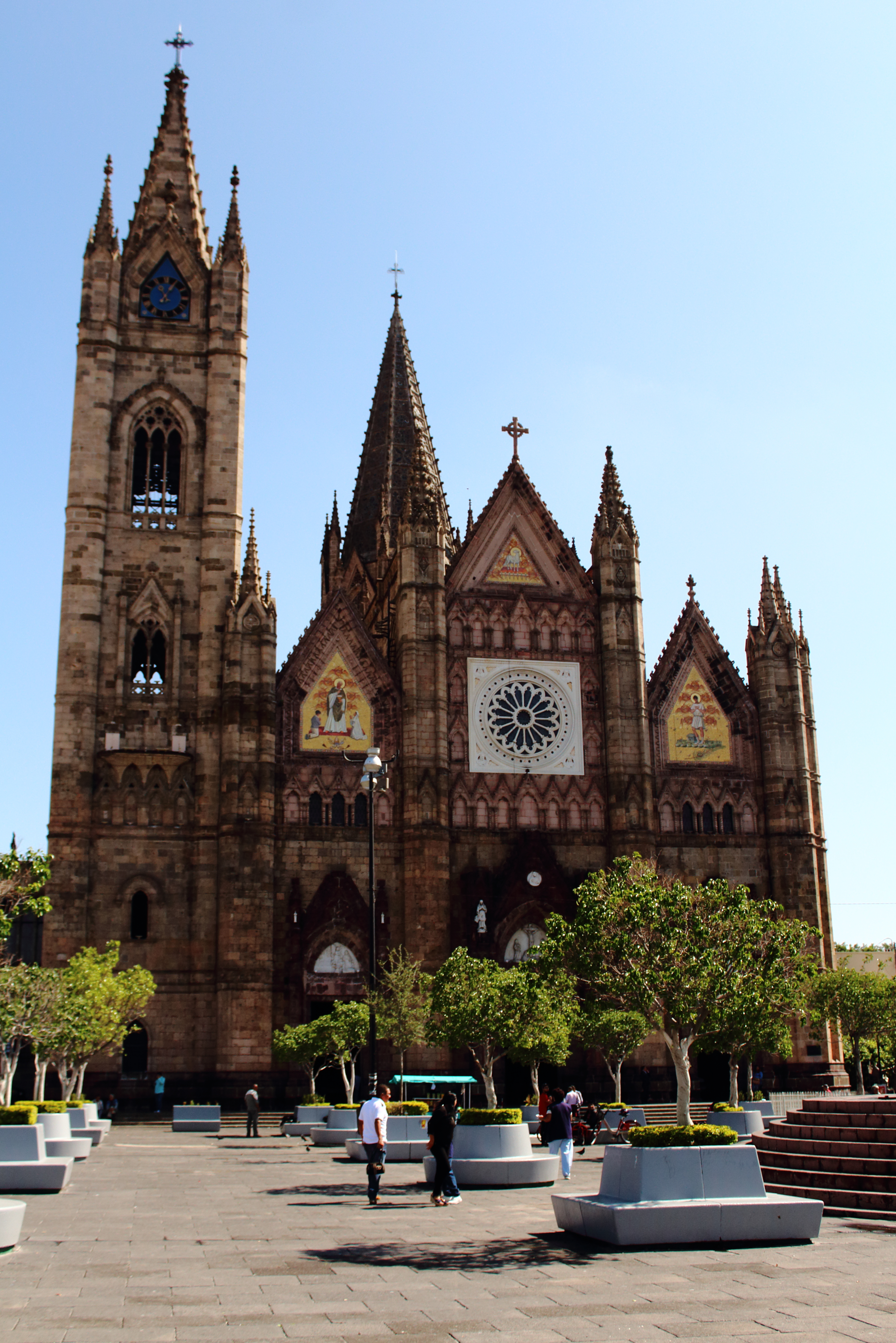
Templo Expiatorio del Santísimo Sacramento

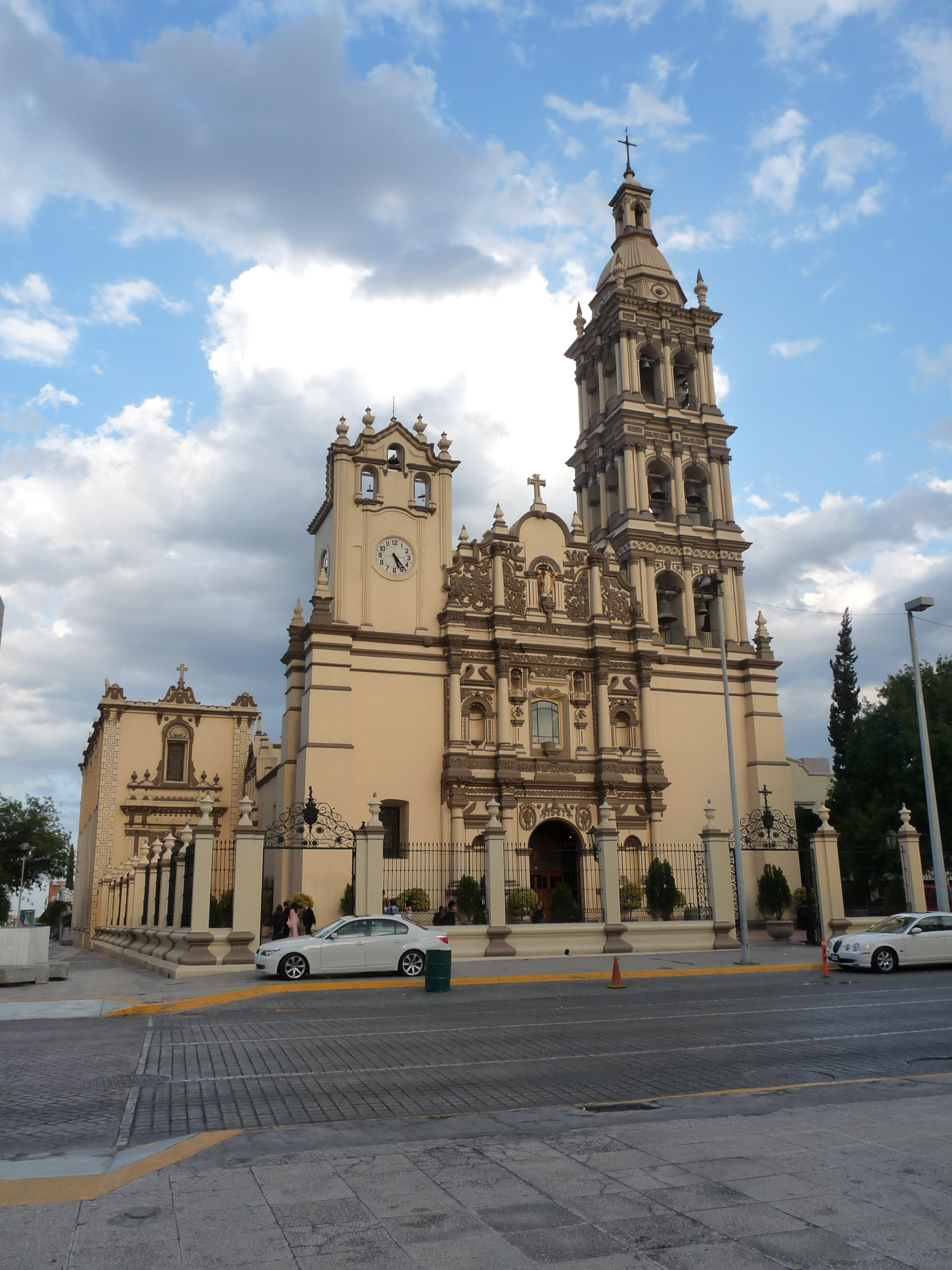
Monterrey Cathedral

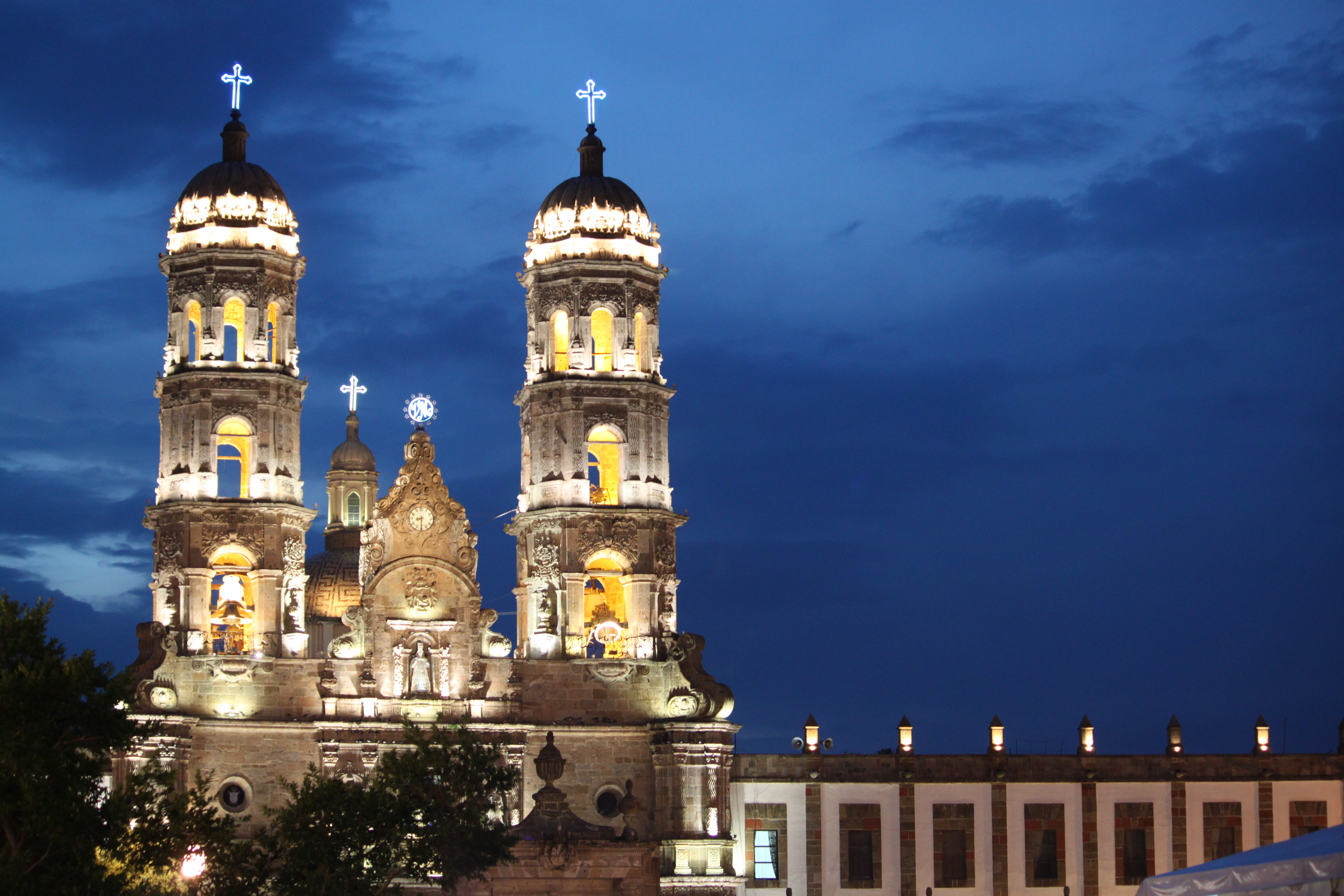
Basilica of Our Lady of Zapopan

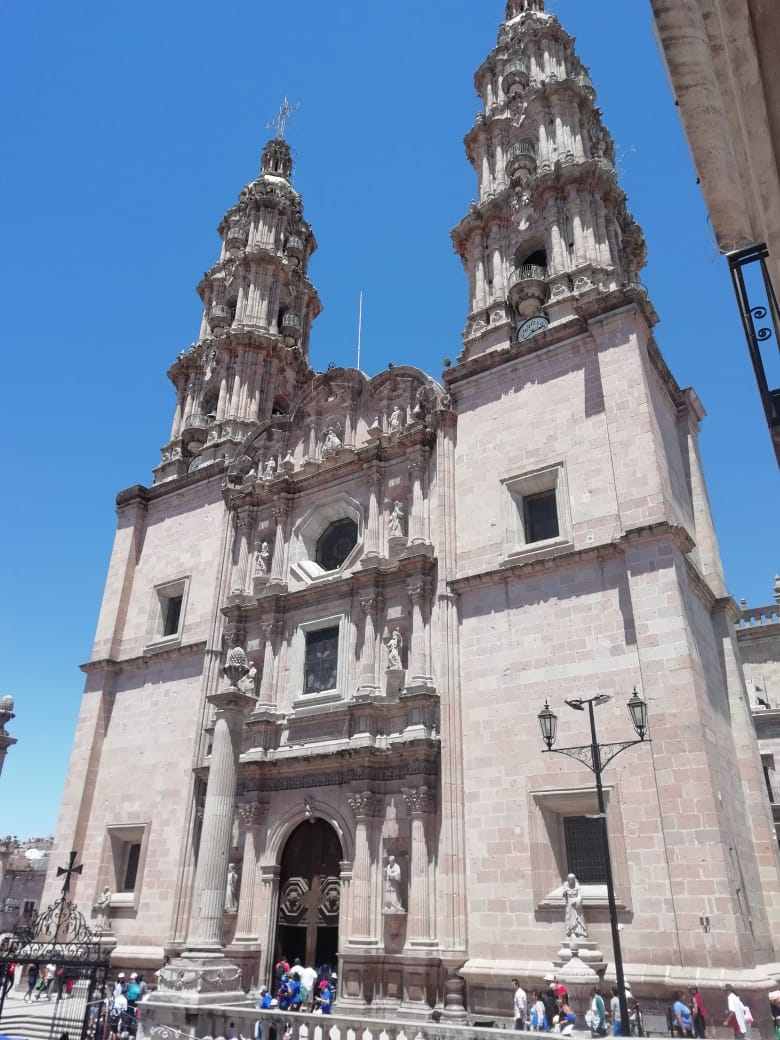
Basilica of San Juan de los Lagos

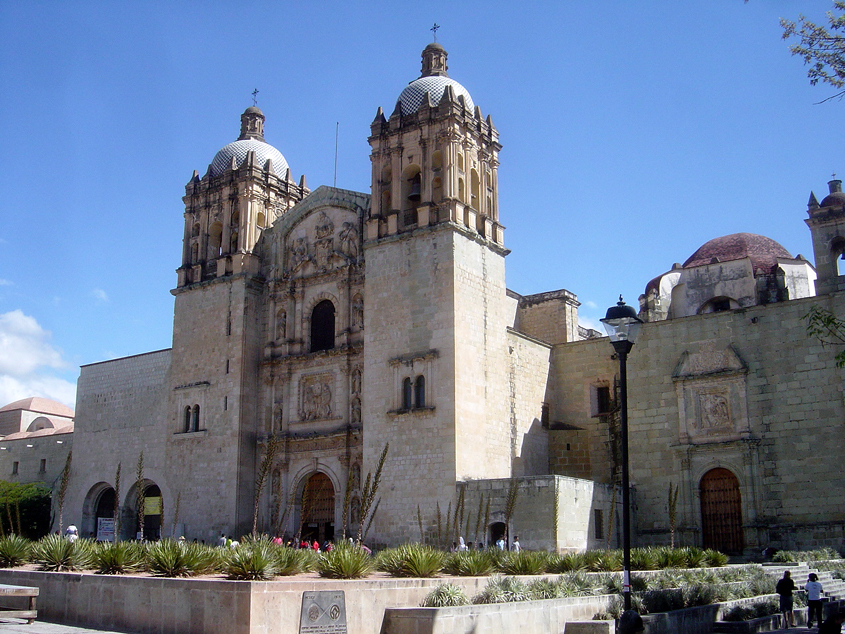
Church of Santo Domingo de Guzmán

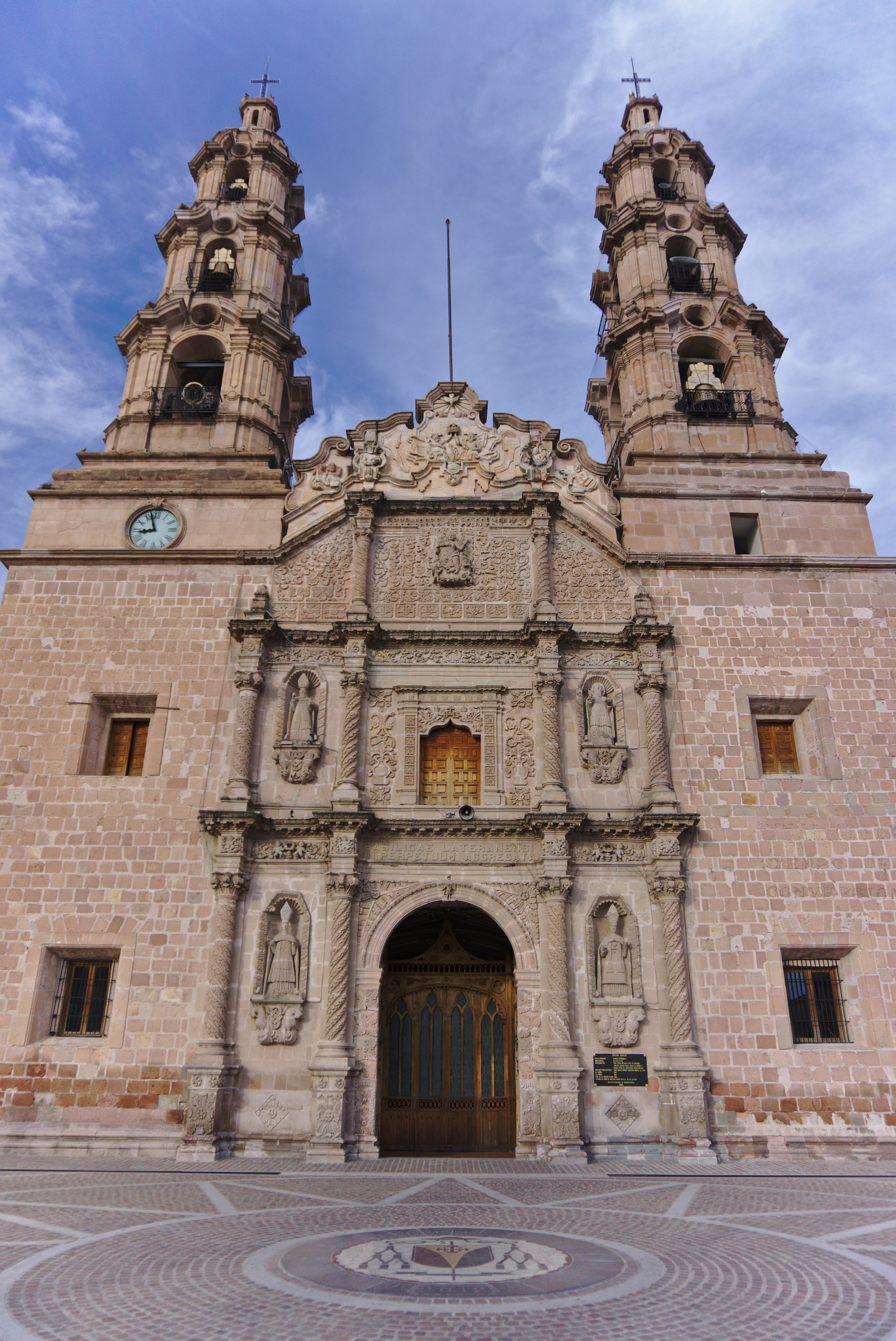
Aguascalientes Cathedral

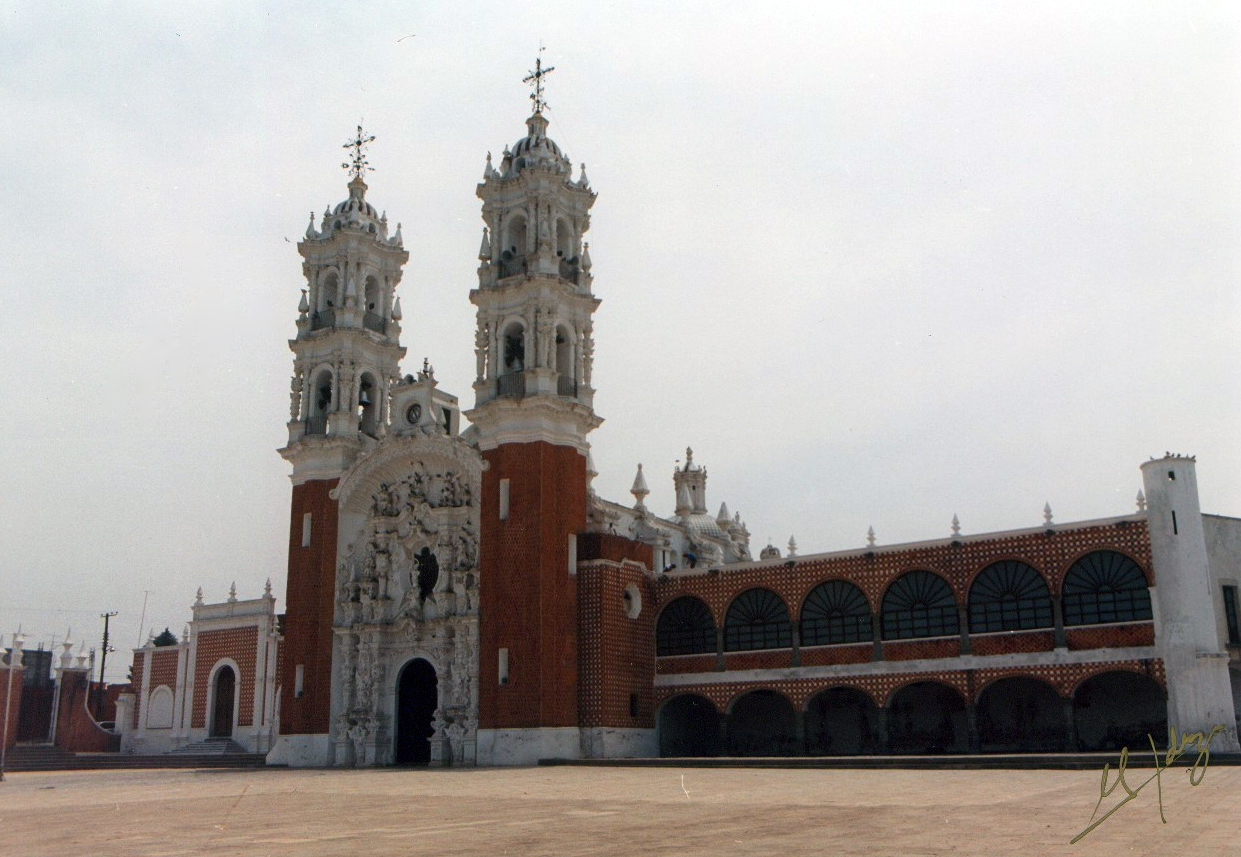
Basilica of Our Lady of Ocotlán

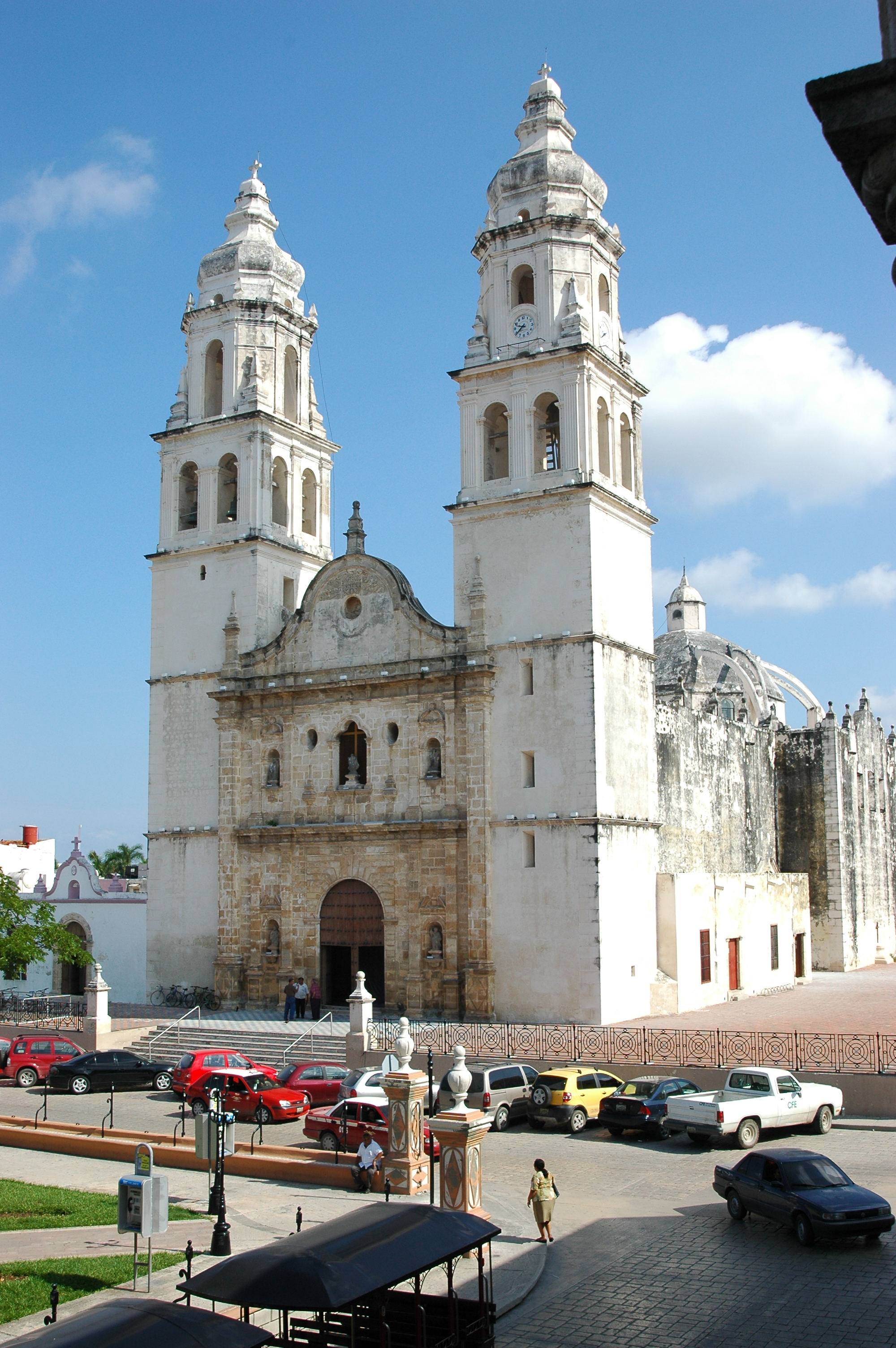
Cathedral of Our Lady of the Immaculate Conception

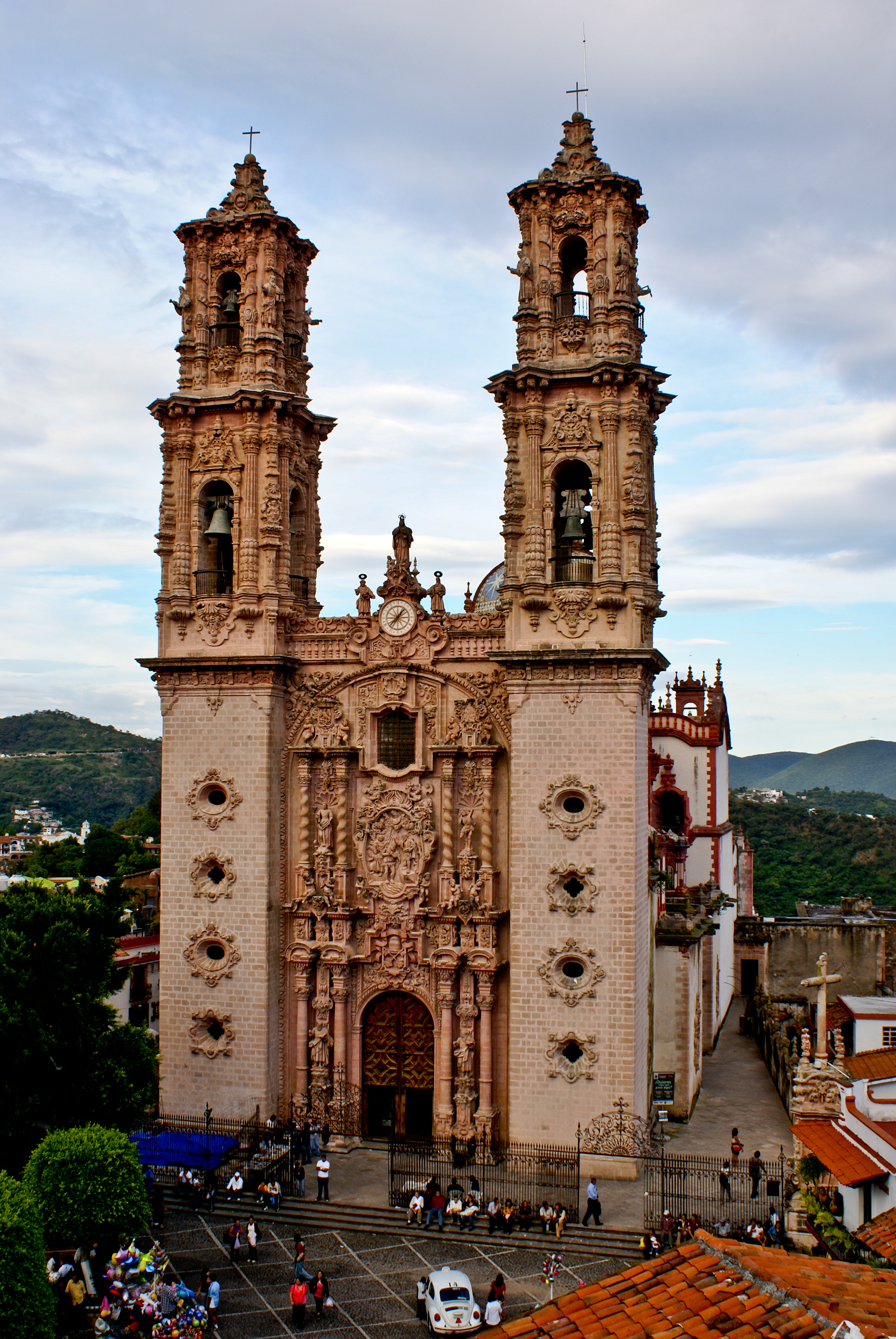
Church of Santa Prisca de Taxco

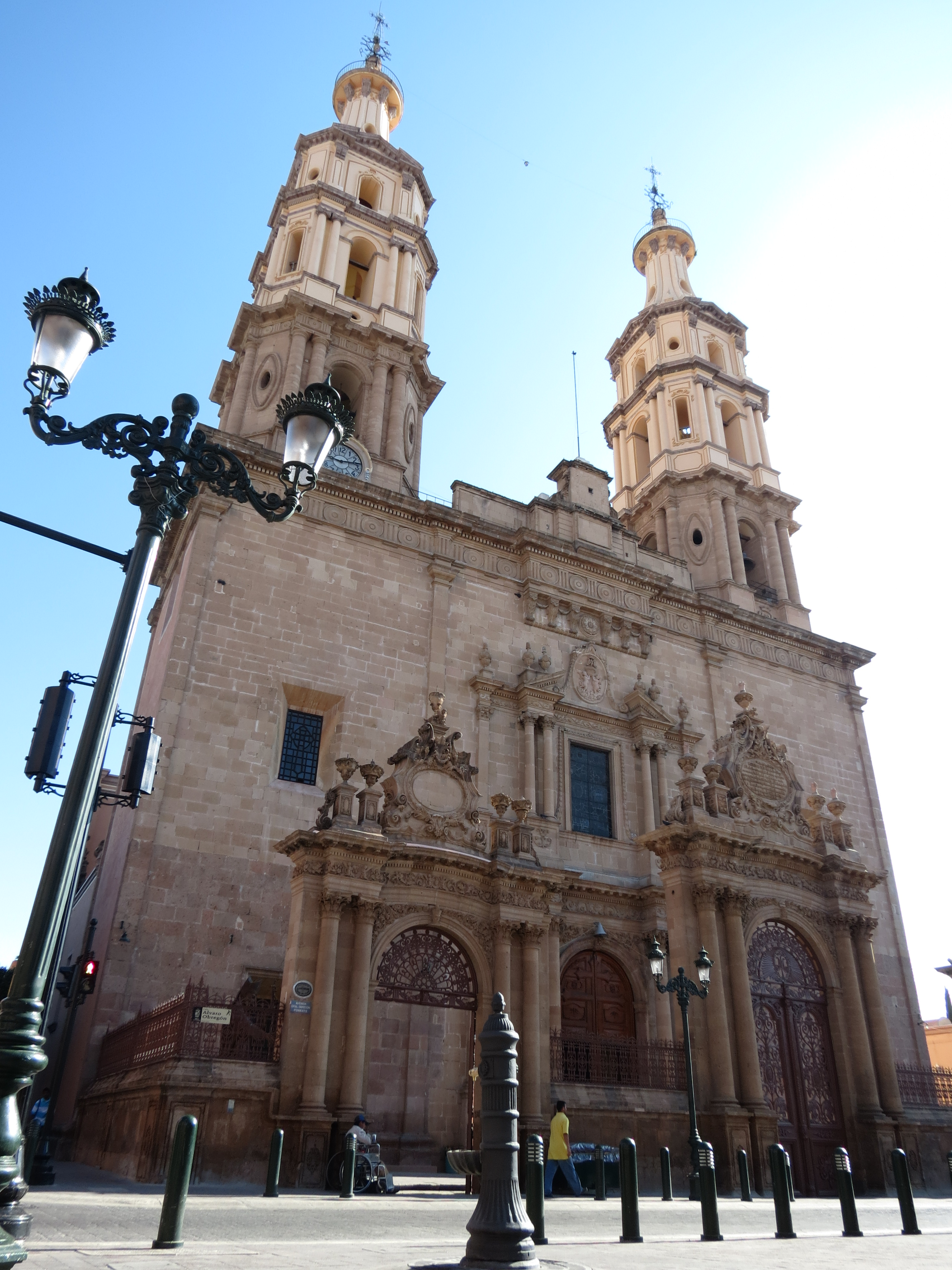
Cathedral of León, Guanajuato

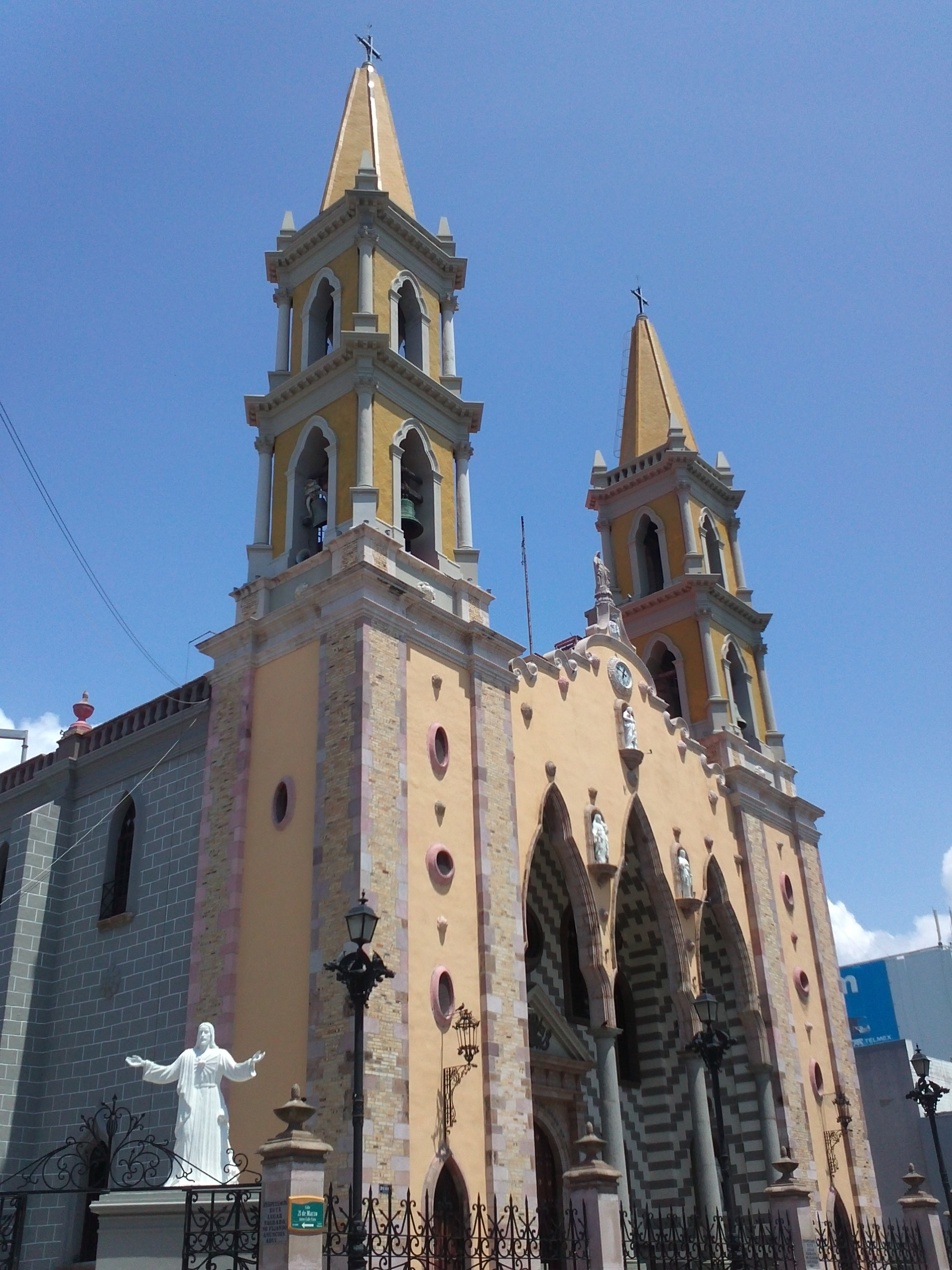
Basilica Cathedral of Mazatlán

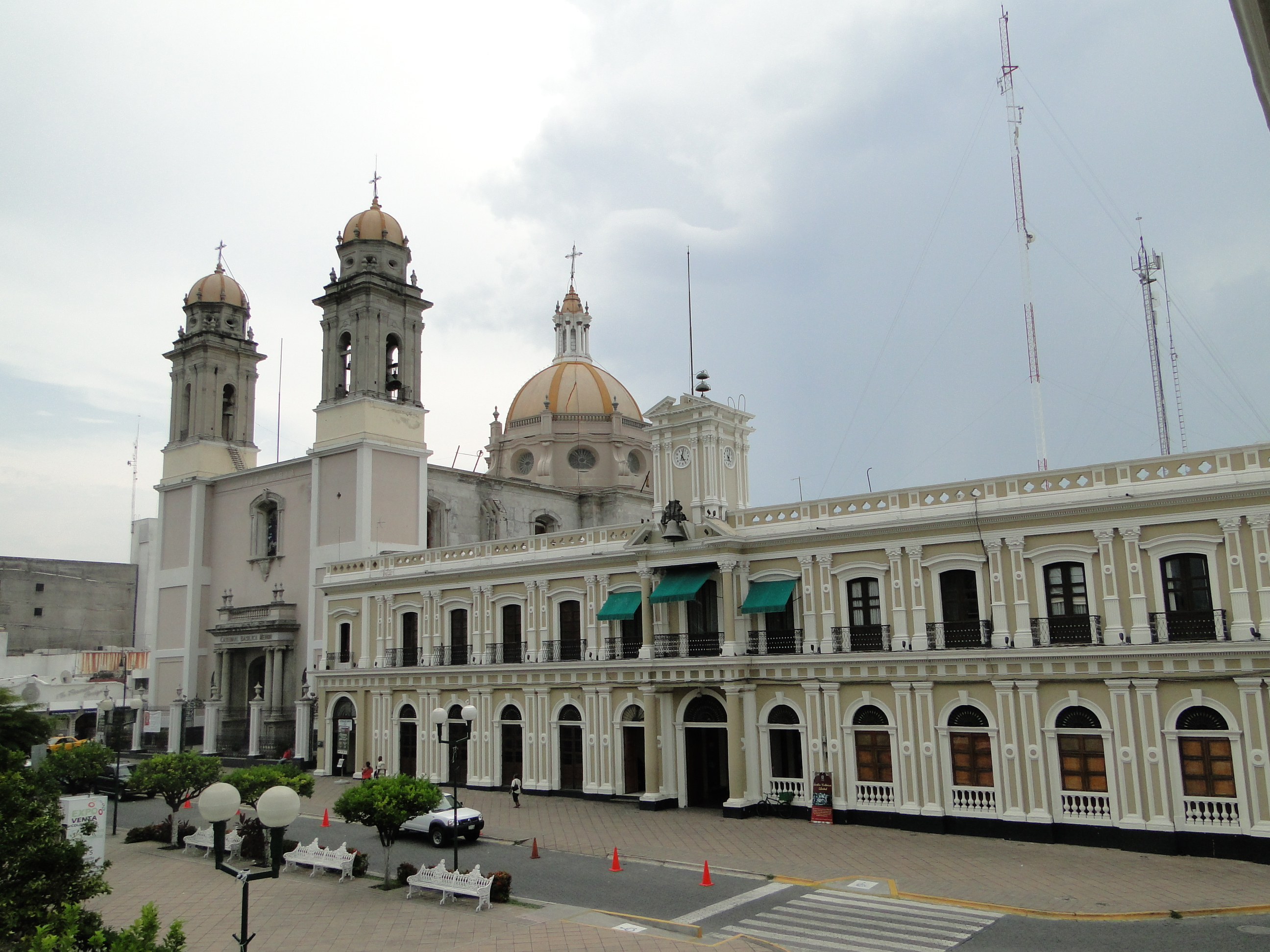
Cathedral Basilica of Colima

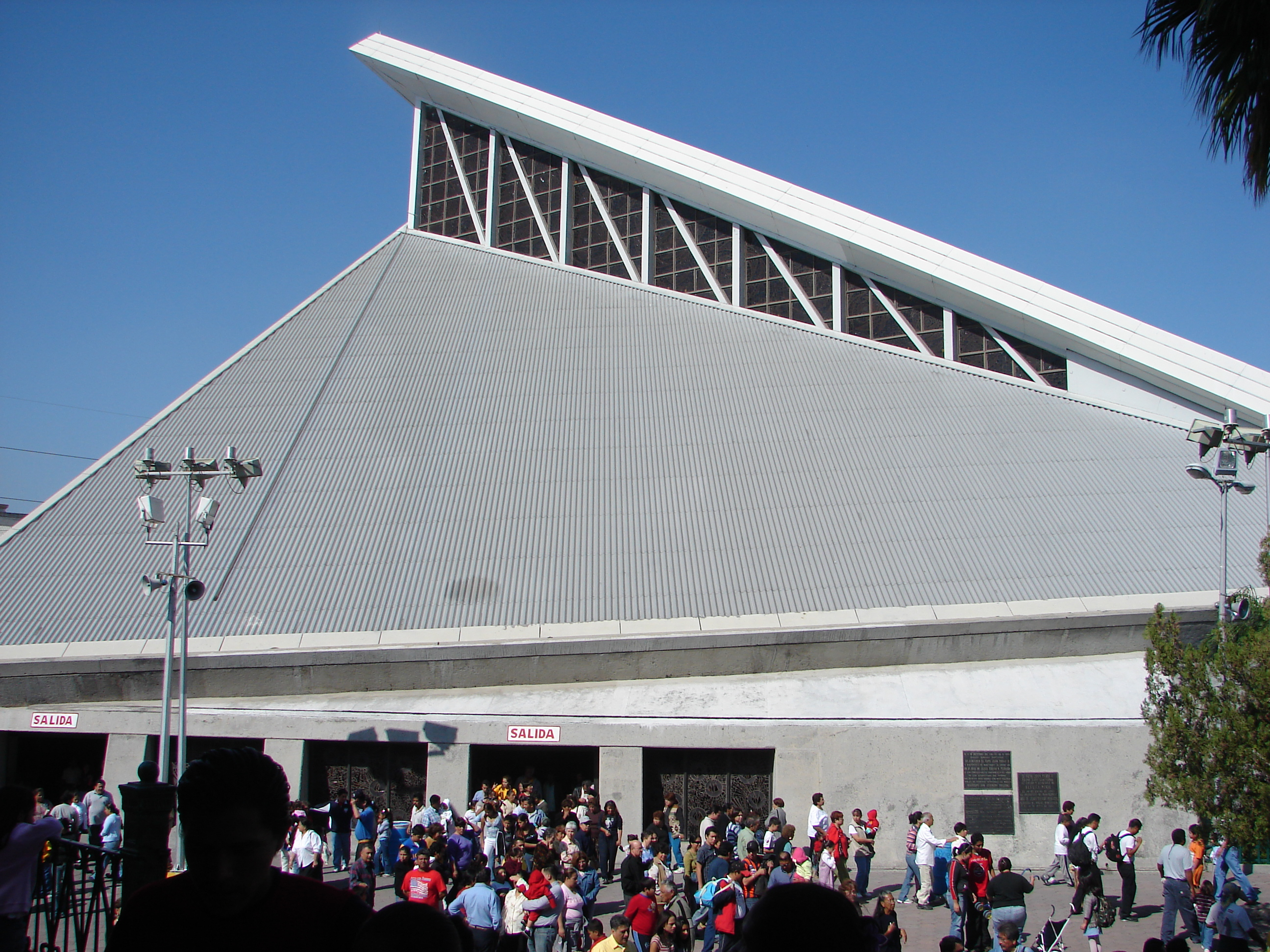
Basilica of Guadalupe, Monterrey

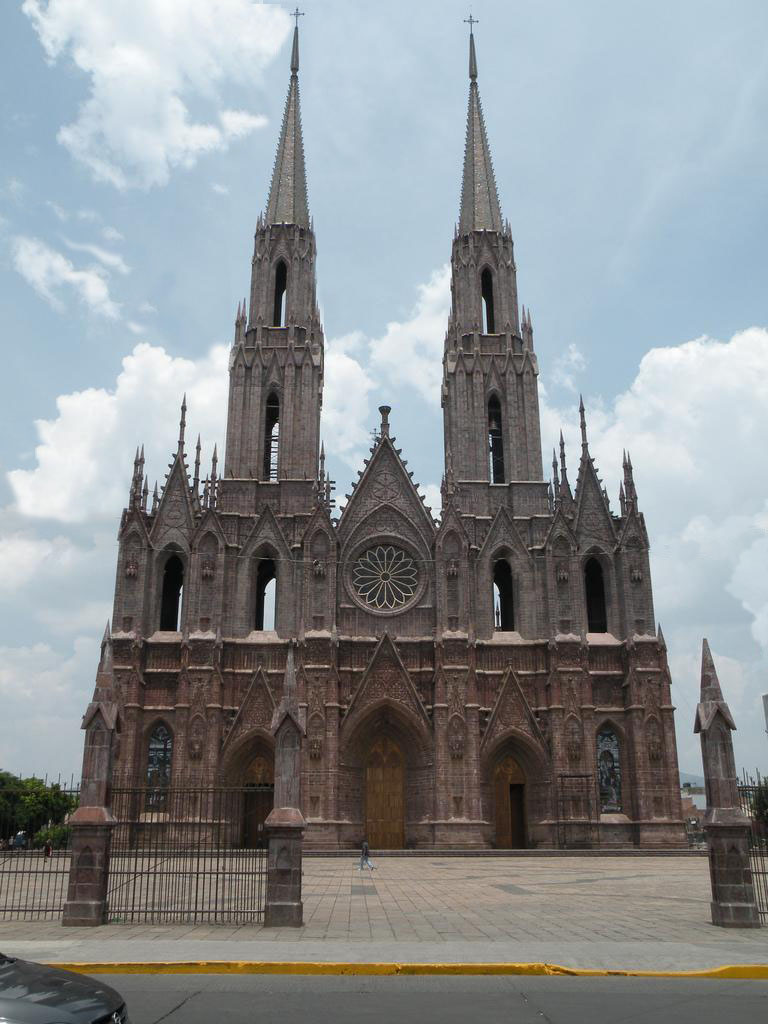
Cathedral of Our Lady of Guadalupe, Zamora

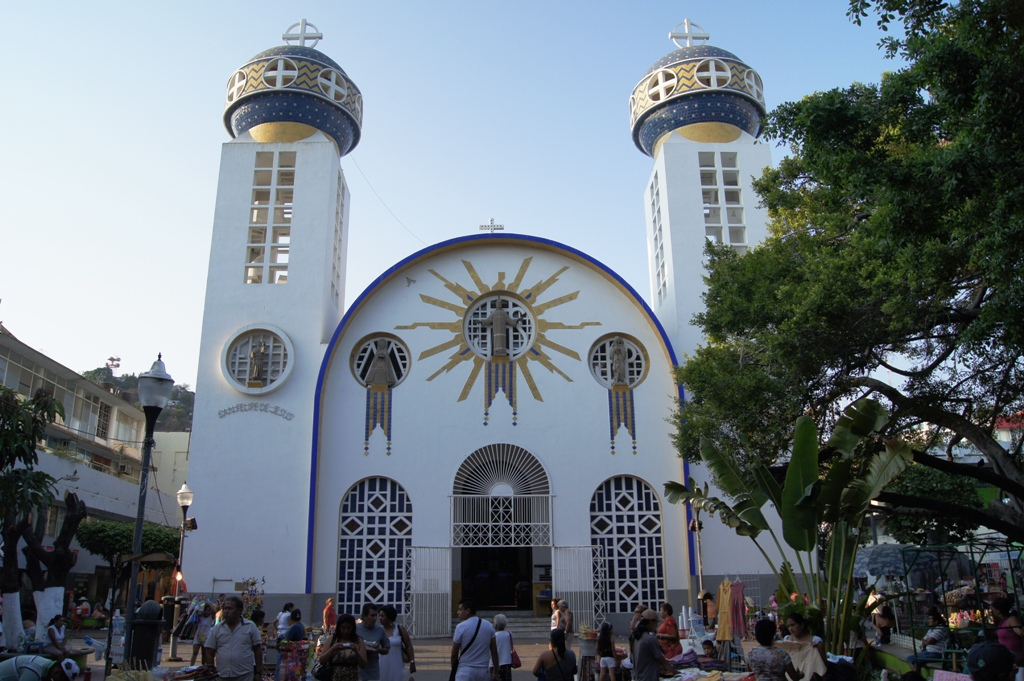
Our Lady of Solitude Cathedral, Acapulco

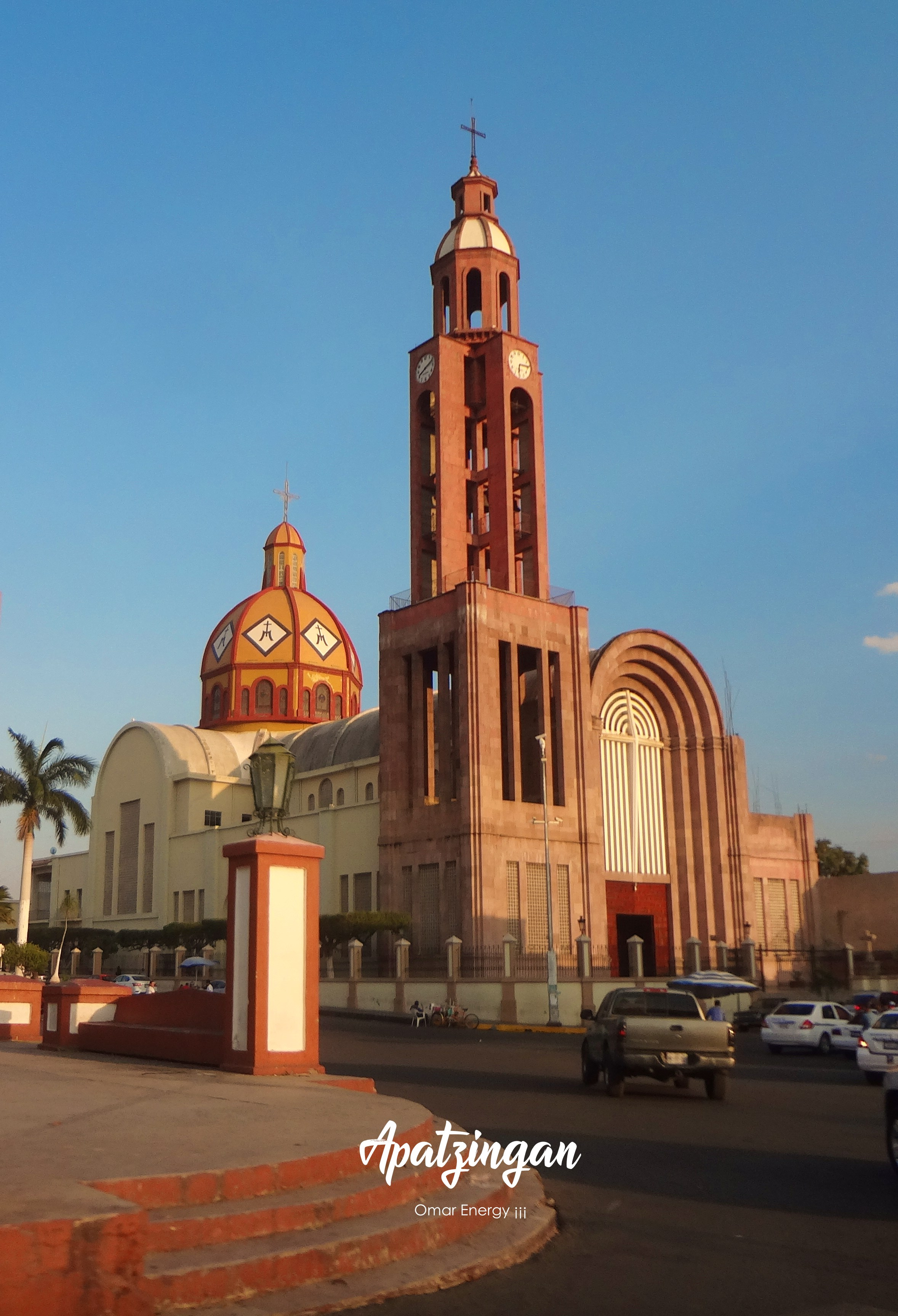
Apatzingán Cathedral

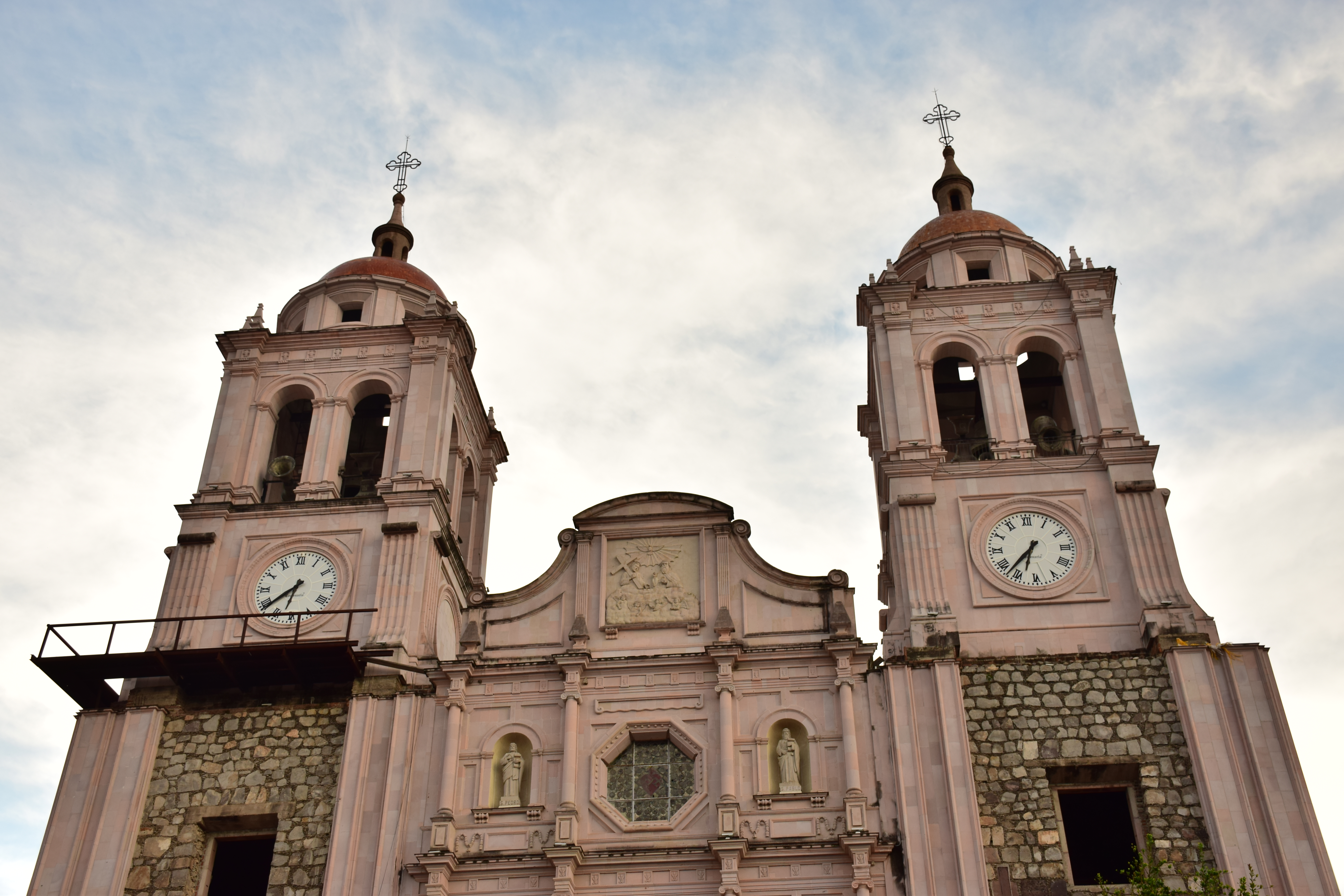
Autlán Cathedral

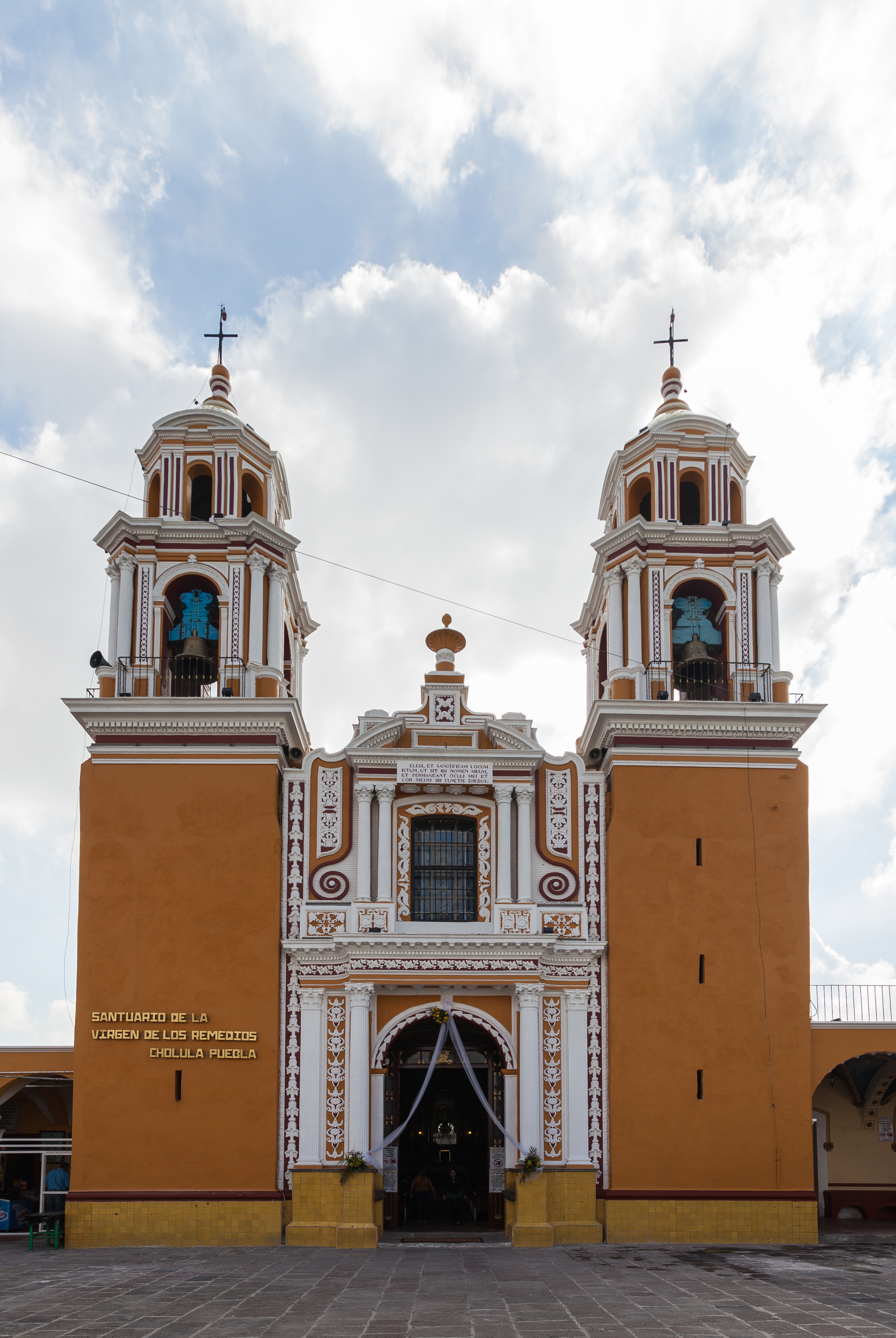
Iglesia de Nuestra Señora de los Remedios, Cholula

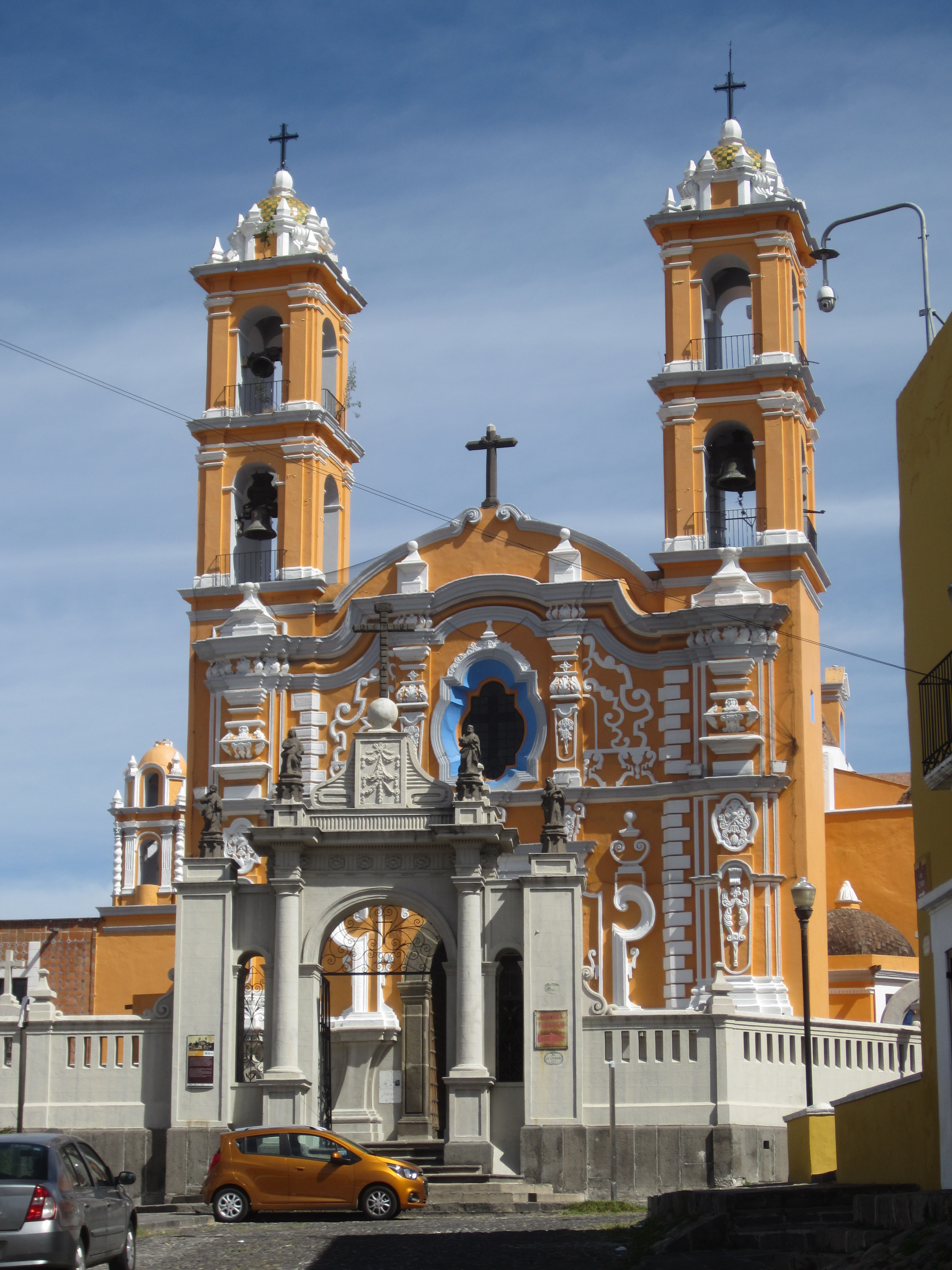
Parish of la Santa Cruz, Puebla

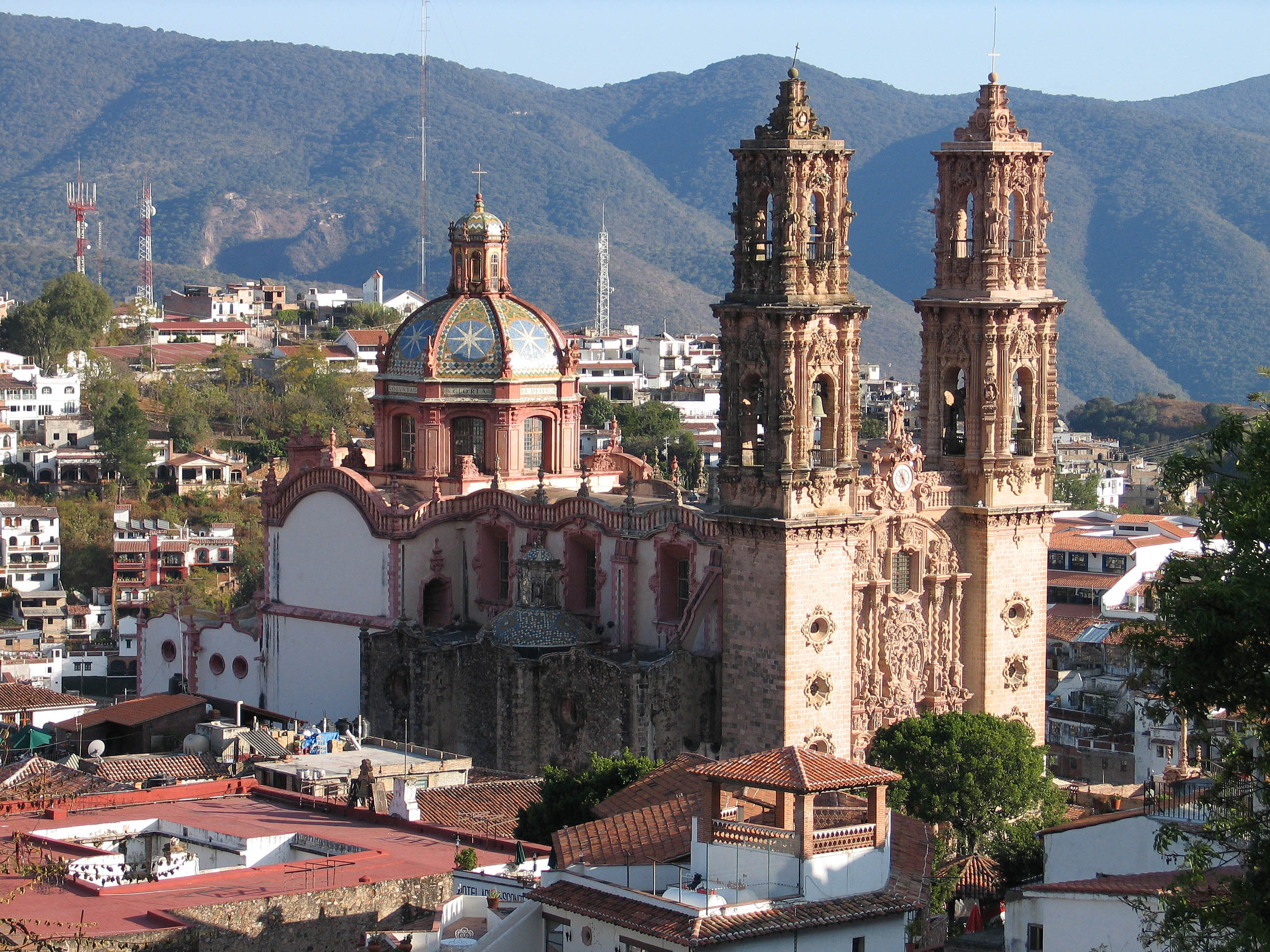
Church of Santa Prisca de Taxco

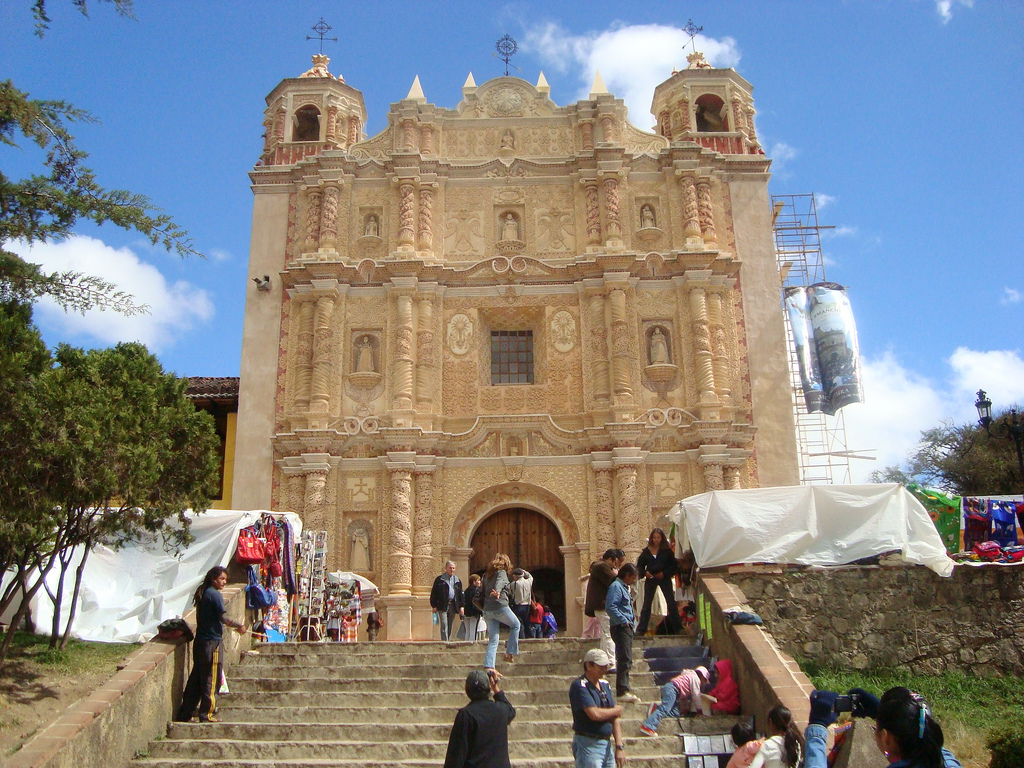
Templo de santo domingo san cristóbal de las casas

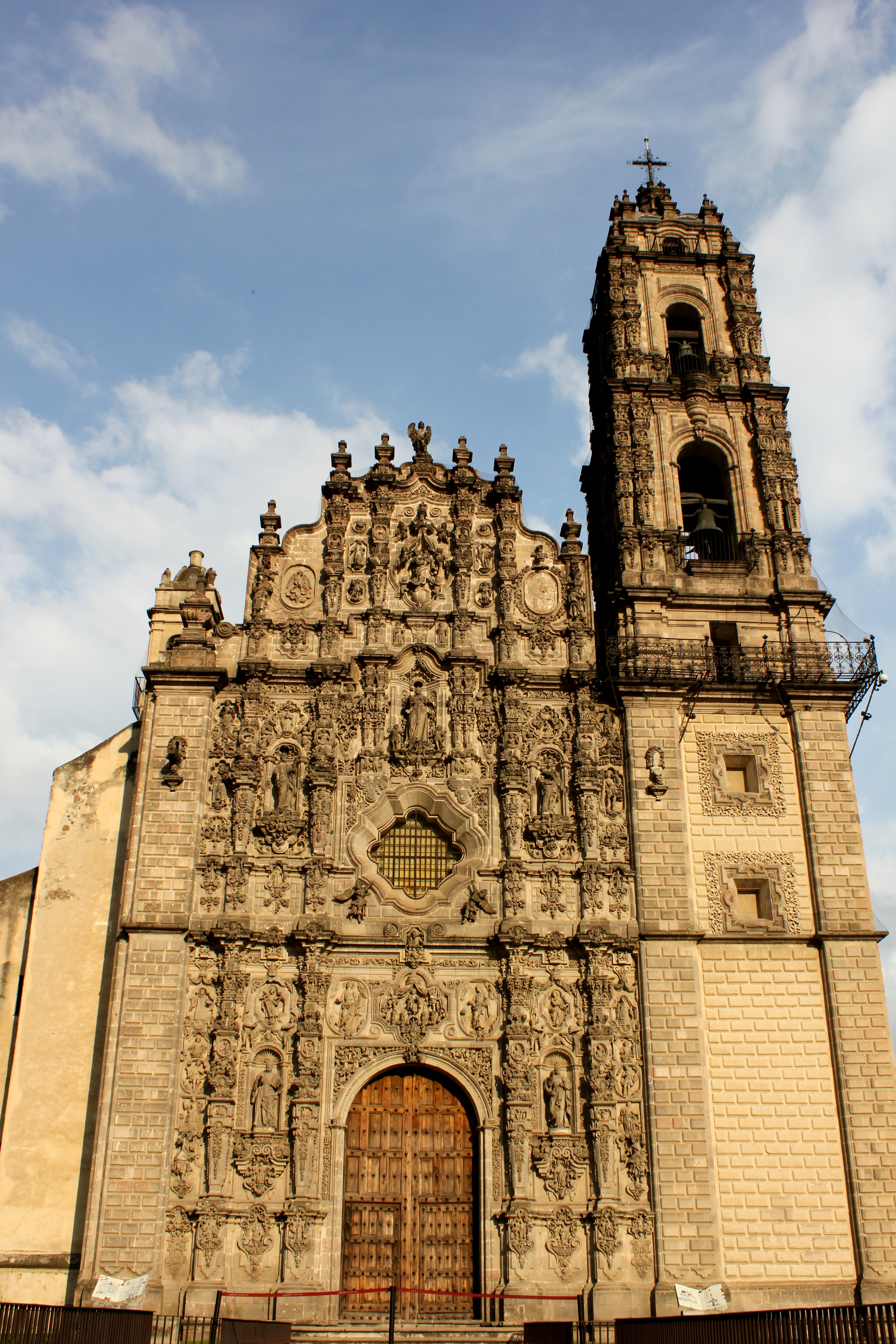
Templo de San Francisco Javier

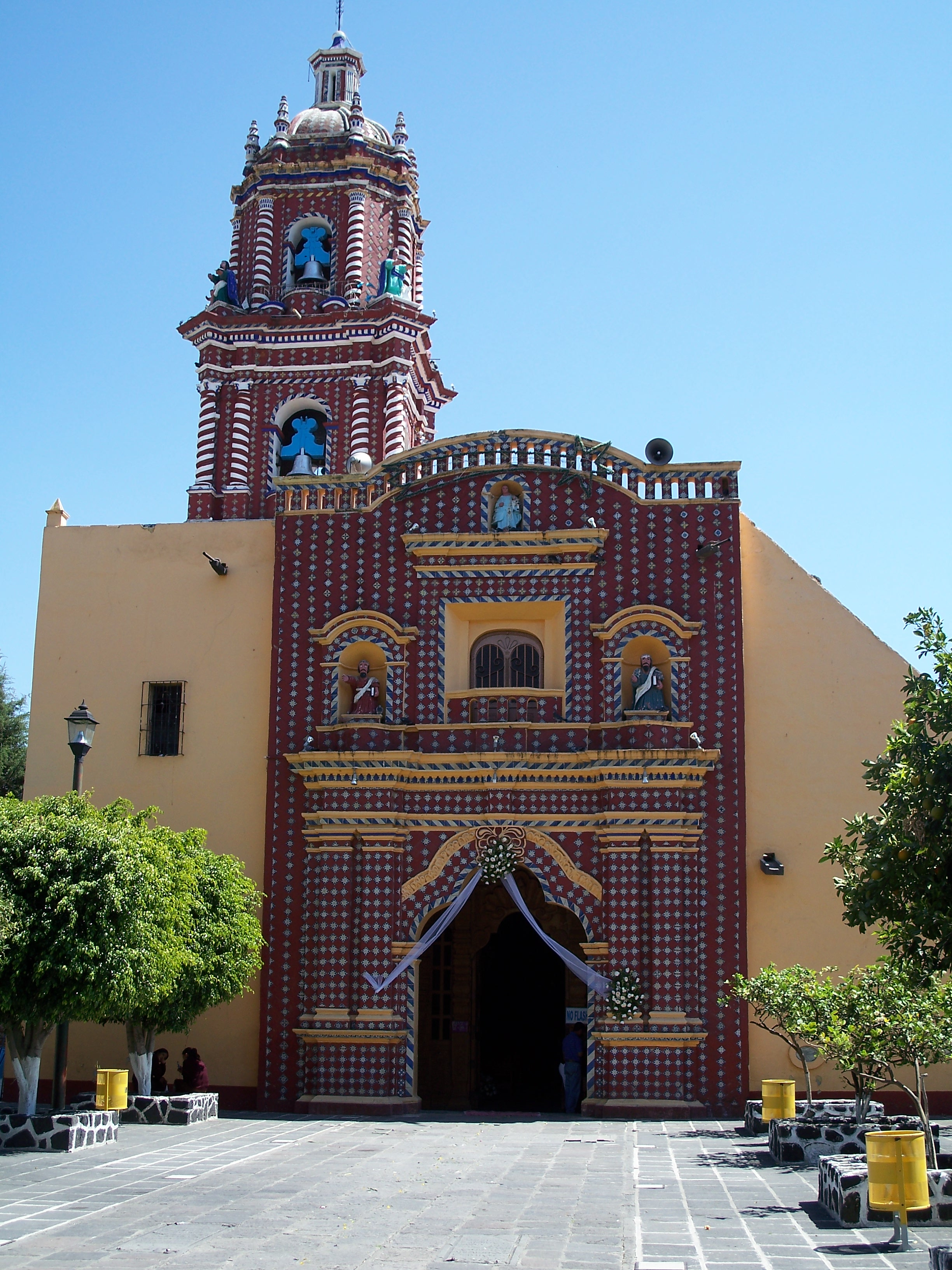
Church of Santa María Tonantzintla

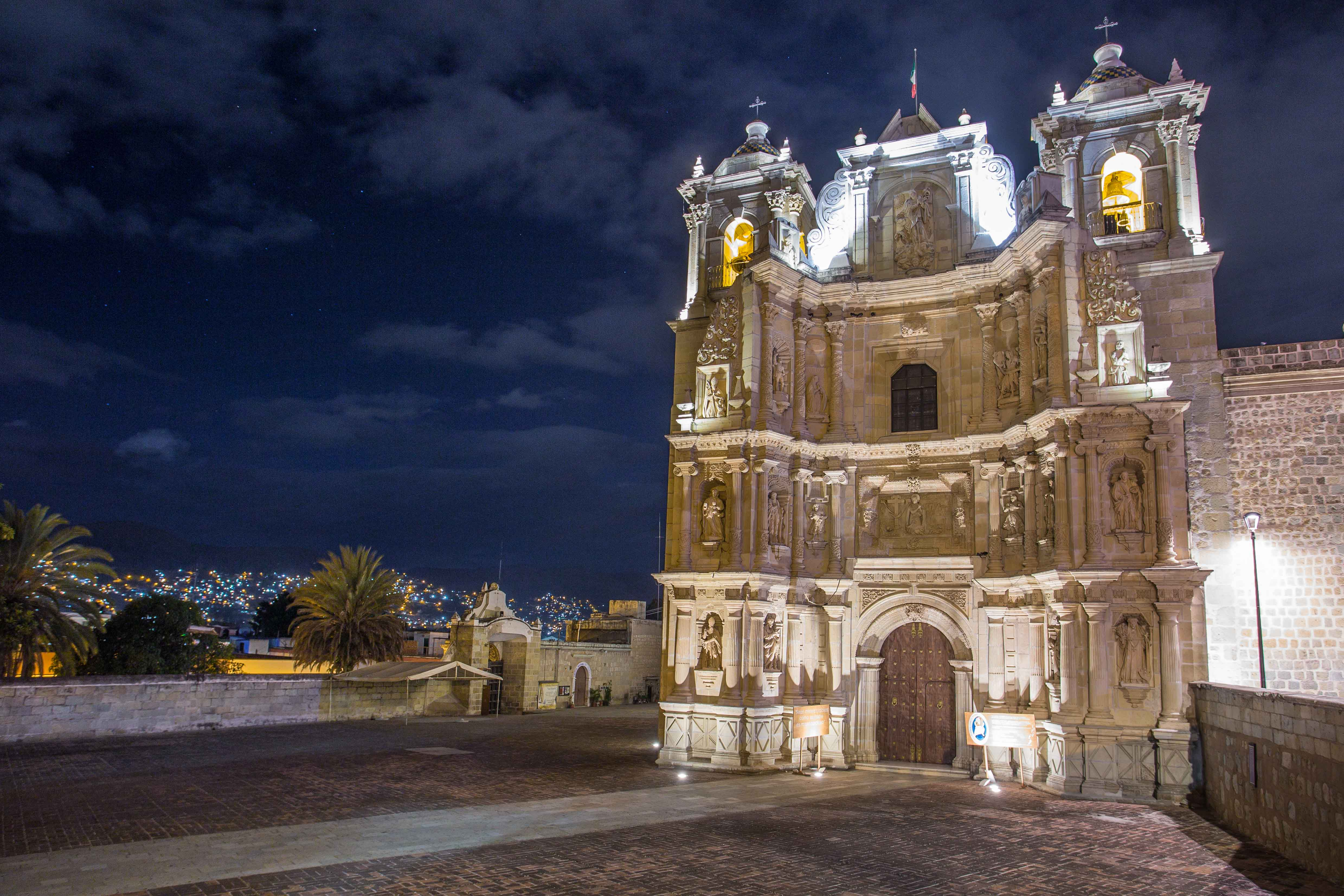
Basilica of Nuestra Señora de Soledad

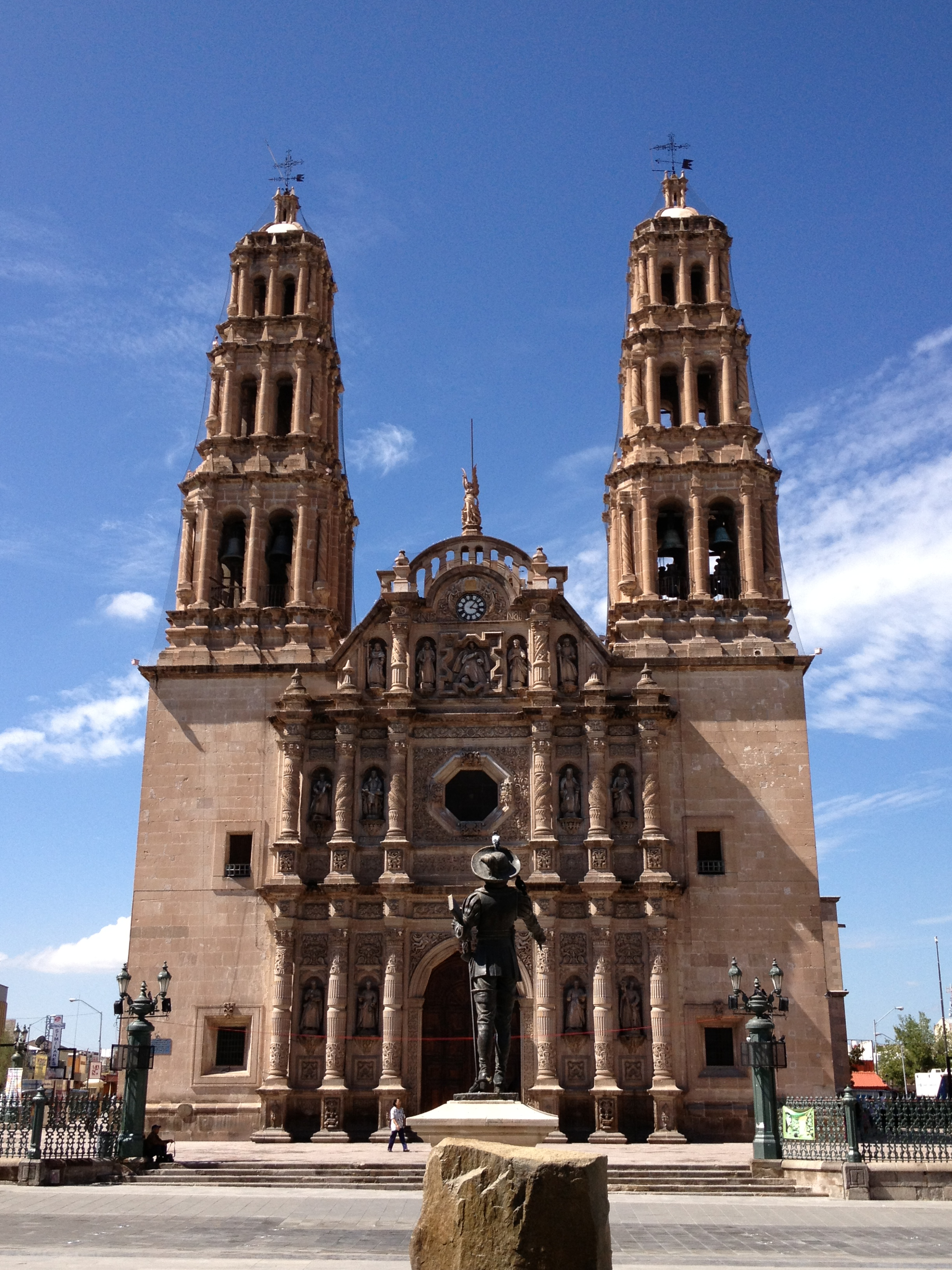
Catedral of Chihuahua

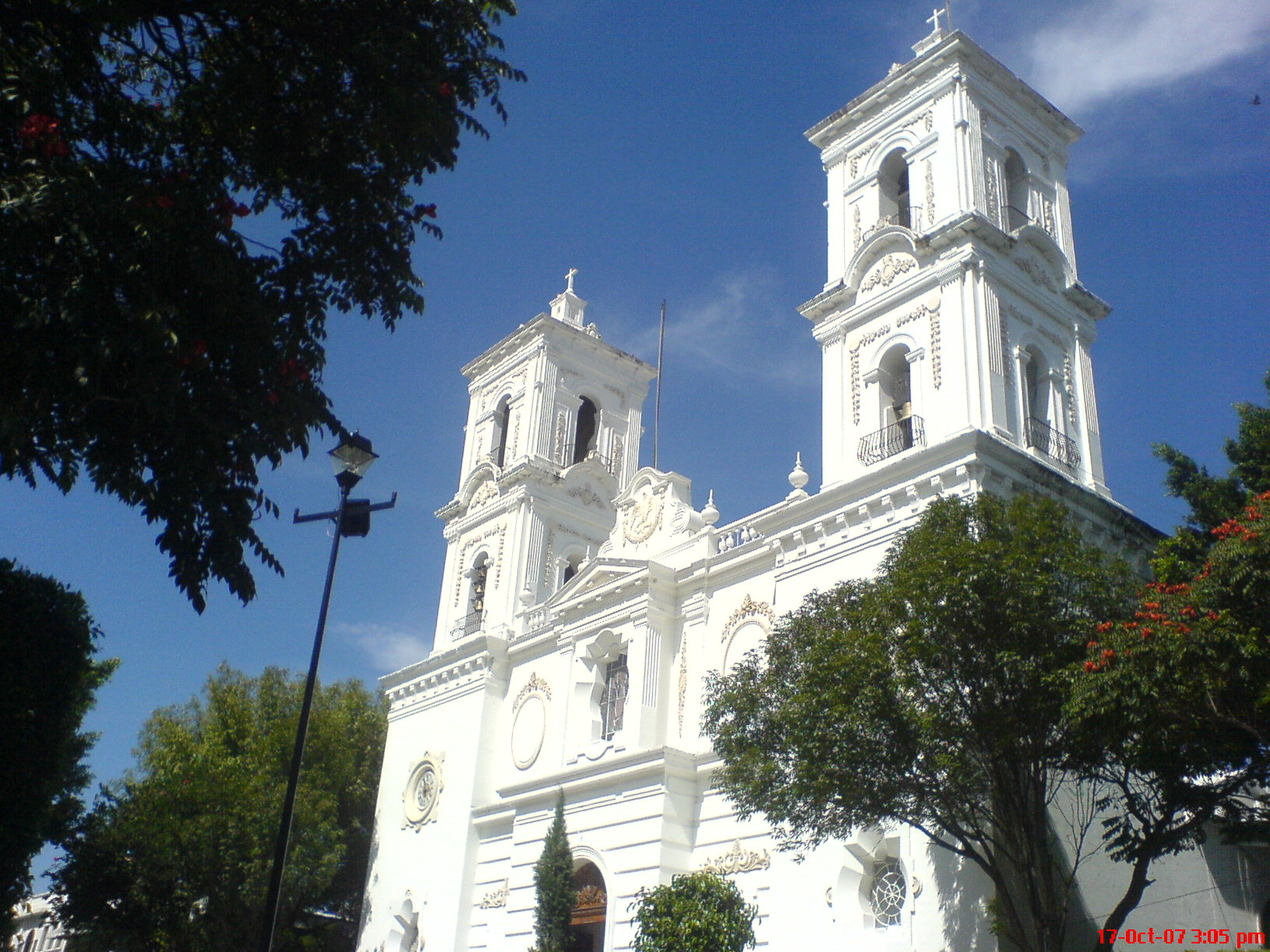
Catedral of Santa Maria in Chilpancingo

== See also ==
- Religion in Mexico
  - Protestantism in Mexico

== Bibliography ==
=== General ===
- Blancarte, Roberto. Historia de la Iglesia Católico en México. Mexico: Fondo de Cultura Económico / El Colegio de Méxiquense 1992.
- Cuevas, Mariano, S.J. Historia de la Iglesia de México. 5 vols. 1921–28.
- Mecham, J. Lloyd. Church and State in Latin America (revised edition). Chapel Hill: University of North Carolina Press 1966.
- Schmitt, Karl. The Roman Catholic Church in Modern Latin America. New York 1972.

=== Colonial Era (1519–1821) ===
- Baudot, Georges. Utopia and History in Mexico: The First Chroniclers of Mexican Civilization, 1520–1569. University of Colorado Press 1995.
- Brading, D.A. Mexican Phoenix: Our Lady of Guadalupe: Image and Tradition across Five Centuries. Cambridge: Cambridge University Press 2001.
- Burkhart, Louise. The Slippery Earth: Nahua-Christian Moral Dialogue in Sixteenth-Century Mexico. Tucson: University of Arizona Press 1989.
- Cline, Sarah. "Church and State: Habsburg New Spain,” in Encyclopedia of Mexico vol. 1, p. 248-50. Chicago: Fitzroy Dearborn 1997.
- Cline, Sarah. "Church and State: Bourbon New Spain,” in Encyclopedia of Mexico vol. 1, p. 250-53. Chicago: Fitzroy Dearborn 1997.
- Cline, Sarah. "The Spiritual Conquest Re-Examined: Baptism and Church Marriage in Early Colonial Mexico." Hispanic American Historical Review 73:3(1993) pp. 453–80.
- Costeloe, Michael. Church Wealth in Mexico: A Study of the Juzgado de Capellanías in the Archbishopric of Mexico, 1800–1856. Cambridge: Cambridge University Press 1967.
- Farriss, N.M. Crown and Clergy in Colonial Mexico, 1759–1821. London: Athlone Press 1958.
- Greenleaf, Richard. The Mexican Inquisition of the Sixteenth Century, 1536–1543. Washington DC: Academy of American Franciscan History 1962.
- Gruzinski, Serge. The Conquest of Mexico: The Incorporation of Indian Societies into the Western World 16th-18th Centuries. Cambridge: Cambridge University Press 1993.
- Kubler, George. Mexican Architecture of the Sixteenth Century. New Haven: Yale University Press 1948.
- Morgan, Ronald J. Spanish American Saints and the Rhetoric of Identity, 1600–1810. Tucson: University of Arizona Press 2002.
- Phelan, John Leddy. The Millennial Kingdom of the Franciscans in the New World. Berkeley: University of California Press 1970.
- Poole, Stafford. Pedro Moya de Contreras. Berkeley: University of California Press 1987.
- Poole, Stafford. Our Lady of Guadalulpe: The Origins and Sources of a Mexican National Symbol, 1531–1797. Tucson: University of Arizona Press.
- Ricard, Robert. The Spiritual Conquest of Mexico. Translated by Lesley Byrd Simpson. Berkeley: University of California Press 1966. (originally published in French in 1933).
- Schwaller, John Frederick. Church and Clergy in Sixteenth-Century Mexico. Albuquerque: University of New Mexico Press 1987.
- Schwaller, John Frederick. The Origins of Church Wealth in Mexico. Albuquerque: University of New Mexico Press 1985.
- Taylor, William B. Magistrates of the Sacred: Priests and Parishioners in Eighteenth-Century Mexico. Stanford: Stanford University Press 1996.
- von Germeten, Nicole. Black Blood Brothers: Confraternities and Social Mobility for Afro-Mexicans. Gainesville: University of Florida Press 2006.

=== Nineteenth Century ===
- Bazant, Jan. Alienation of Church Wealth in Mexico: Social and Economic Aspects of the Liberal Revolution, 1856–1875. Cambridge: Cambridge University Press 1971.
- Callcott, Wilfred Hardy. Church and State in Mexico, 1822–1857. Durham: Duke University Press 1926.
- Ceballos Ramírez, Manuel. "La Encíclica Rerum Novarum y los Trabajadores Católicos en la Ciudad de México, 1891–1913." Historia Mexicana 33:1 (July–September 1983).
- Costeloe, Michael P. Church and State in Independent Mexico: A Study of the Patronage Debate, 1821–1857. London: Royal Historical Society 1978.
- Mijanos y González, Pablo. The Lawyer of the Church: Bishop Clemente de Jesús Munguía and the Clerical Response to the Mexican Liberal Reforma. Lincoln: University of Nebraska Press 2015.
- Schmitt, Karl M. " Catholic Adjustment to the Secular State: The Case of Mexico, 1867–1911." Catholic Historical ReviewXLVIII No. 2 (July 1962) 182–204.
- Scholes, Walter V. "Church and state in the Mexican Constitutional Convention, 1856-57." The Americas IV No. 2. (Oct. 1947), pp. 151–74.

=== Twentieth Century and Third Millennium ===
- Bailey, David C. Viva Cristo Rey!: The Cristero Rebellion and Church-State Conflict in Mexico. Austin: University of Texas Press 1974.
- Bantjes, Adrian. "Idolatry and Iconoclasm in Revolutionary Mexico: The Dechristianization Campaigns, 1929–1940." Mexican Studies/Estudios Mexicanos 13:1 (winter 1997), pp. 87–120.
- Blancarte, Roberto. "Recent Changes in Church-State Relations in Mexico: An Historical Approach," Journal of Church & State, autumn 1993, Vol 35. Issue 4.
- Butler, Matthew. "Keeping the Faith in Revolutionary Mexico: Clerical and Lay Resistance to Religious Persecution, East Michoacán, 1926–1929." The Americas 59:1 July 2002, 9-32.
- Camp, Roderic Ai. Crossing Swords: Politics and Religion in Mexico. New York: Oxford University Press 1997.
- Ceballos Ramírez, Manuel. El Catolicismo Social: Un Tercero en Discordia, Rerum Novarum, la 'Cuestión Social,' y la Movilización de los Católicos Mexicanos (1891–1911). Mexico: El Colegio de México 1991.
- Chand, Vikram K. Mexico's Political Awakening. Notre Dame: University of Notre Dame Press 2001.
- Ellis, L. Elthan. "Dwight Morrow and the Church-State Controversy in Mexico." Hispanic American Historical Review Vol 38, 4 (Nov. 1958), 482–505.
- Espinosa, David. Jesuit Student Groups, the Universidad Iberoamericana, and Political Resistance in Mexico, 1913–1979. Albuquerque: University of New Mexico Press 2014.
- Jrade, Ramón, "Inquiries into the Cristero Insurrection Against the Mexican Revolution." Latin American Research Review 20:2 (1985.
- Mabry, Donald J. Mexico's Acción Nacional: A Catholic Alternative to Revolution. Syracuse: Syracuse University Press 1973.
- Meyer, Jean. La Cristiada. 3 vols. Mexico City: Siglo XXI (1985).
- Meyer, Jean. The Cristero Rebellion: Mexican People Between Church and State. Cambridge: Cambridge University Press 1976.
- Muro, Victor Gabriel. Iglesia y movimientos sociales en México, 1972–1987. Mexico: Colegio de Michoacán 1994.
- Muro, Victor Gabriel. "Catholic Church: Mexico" in Encyclopedia of Mexico, vol. 1. Chicago: Fitzroy Dearborn 1997, 219–222.
- Purnell, Jennie. "The Cristero Rebellion" in Encyclopedia of Mexico. vol. 1. Chicago: Fitzroy Dearborn 1997, 374–377.
- Purnell, Jennie. Popular Movements and State Formation in Revolutionary Mexico: The Agraristas and Cristeros of Michoacán. Durham: Duke University Press 1999.
- Quirk, Robert E. The Mexican Revolution and the Catholic Church, 1910–1929. Bloomington: Indiana University Press 1973.
- Rice, Elizabeth Ann. The Diplomatic Relations Between the United States and Mexico as Affected by the Struggle for Religious Liberty in Mexico, 1925-29. Washington DC 1959.
- Sherman, John W. "Liberation Theology" in Encyclopedia of Mexico, vol. 1, 742–45. Chicago: Fitzroy Dearborn 1997.
- Vargas, Jorge A. "Freedom of Religion and Public Worship in Mexico: A Legal Commentary on the 1992 Federal Act on Religious Matters," BYU Law Review Volume 421 (1998), Issue 2, article 6.
- Wright-Rios, Edward. Revolutions in Mexican Catholicism: Reform and Revolution in Oaxaca, 1887–1934. Durham: Duke University Press 2009.
