= Roberto Blancarte =

Mexican sociologist (born 1957)

- Born: Roberto J. Blancarte Pimentel; August 29, 1957 (age 69); Mazatlán, Sinaloa, Mexico
- Awards: Order of St. Gregory the Great

Academic background
- Education: National Autonomous University of Mexico; School for Advanced Studies in the Social Sciences

Academic work
- Institutions: El Colegio de México
- Main interests: Sociology, History, Social Sciences

Roberto J. Blancarte Pimentel (born August 29, 1957 in Mazatlán, Sinaloa, Mexico) is a Mexican sociologist, historian and social scientist, specialized in religion, secularism and democracy. He is a professor-researcher at El Colegio de México (COLMEX), affiliated with the Center for Sociological Studies (CES), where he served as director from 2006 to 2012.

Blancarte was a Counselor at the Embassy of Mexico to the Holy See, from March 1995 to January 1998, when he was awarded the Order of Saint Gregory the Great. Until 1999, he also served as Coordinator of Advisors to the Undersecretariat of Religious Affairs of the Mexican Secretariat of the Interior. He left that position to join the Center for Sociological Studies (CES) at COLMEX.

He has conducted a series of studies on the nuances of secularism in Latin America, in which he defends democratic legitimacy through popular sovereignty, replacing the demand for religious legitimacy in the public sphere. Therefore, he is an avid advocate for secularism and the end of religious interference in politics.

== See also ==
- Religious studies
- Sociology of religion
- Secularism
- Secular State
