= Archdiocese of Puebla de los Ángeles =

Latin Catholic jurisdiction in Mexico

Coordinates: 19.0429°N 98.1984°W

Archdiocese of Puebla de los Angeles Archidioecesis Angelorum Arquidiócesis de Puebla de los Ángeles
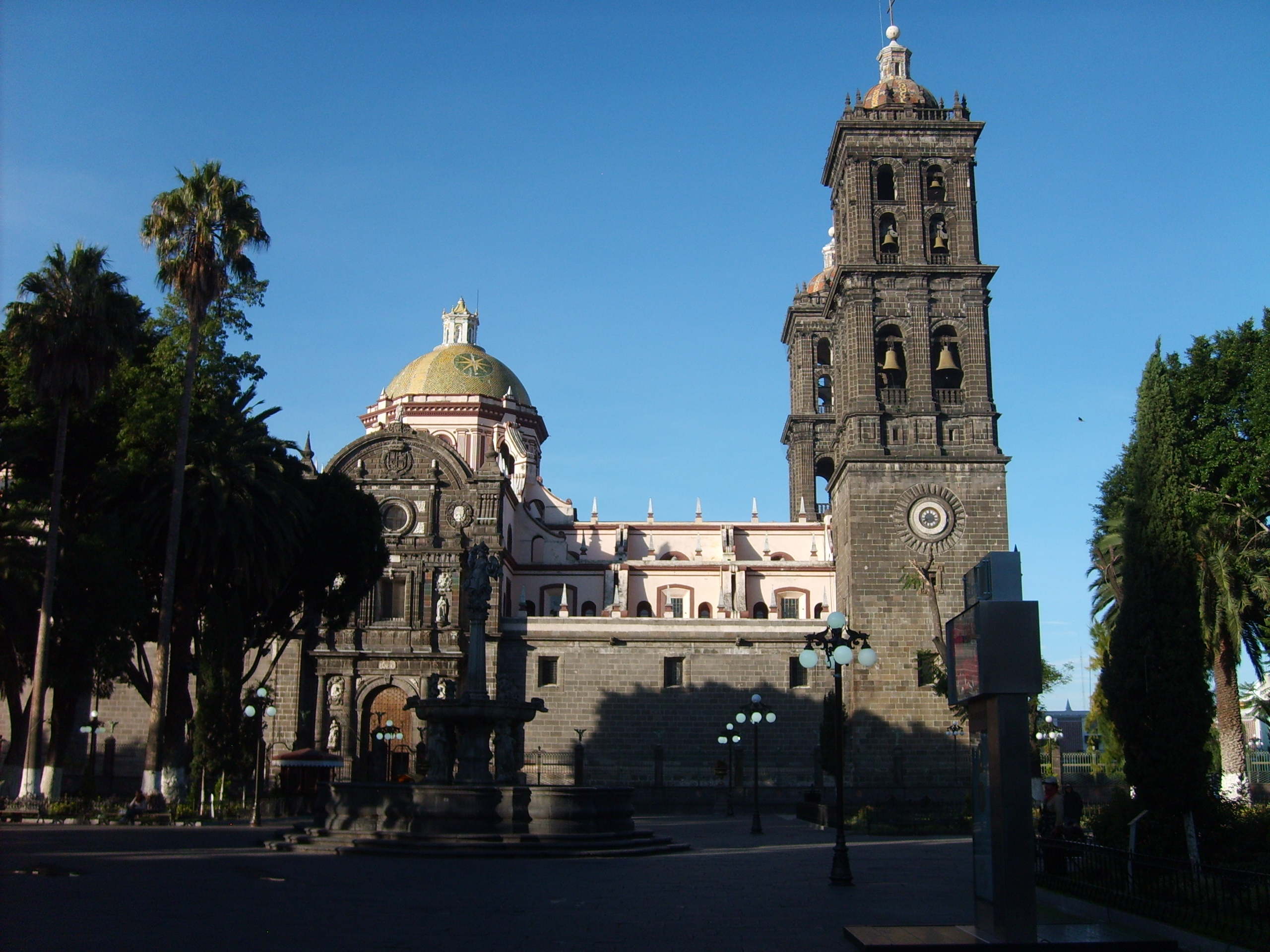
- Catedral Metropolitana de Nuestra Señora de la Purísima Concepción

Location
- Country: Mexico
- Headquarters: Puebla, Puebla, Mexico

Statistics
- Area: 20,937 km^{2} (8,084 sq mi)
- Population: Total; Catholics: (as of 2023); 4,005,517; 3,074,000 (76.7%)
- Parishes: 319

Information
- Denomination: Catholic Church
- Sui iuris church: Latin Church
- Rite: Roman Rite
- Established: 13 October 1525; 501 years ago
- Cathedral: Cathedral of the Immaculate Conception
- Patron saint: Virgin of Ocotlán
- Secular priests: 594 (444 Diocesan, 150 Religious Orders)

Current leadership
- Pope: Leo XIV
- Archbishop: Jorge Carlos Patrón Wong
- Auxiliary Bishops: Tomás López Durán; Francisco Javier Martínez Castillo
- Bishops emeritus: Víctor Sánchez Espinosa

Map

Website
- arquidiocesisdepuebla.mx

The Archdiocese of Puebla de los Ángeles (Latin: Archidioecesis Angelorum) is a Latin Church ecclesiastical territory or archdiocese of the Catholic Church. It is the oldest Catholic diocese in Mexico. It was established on 13 October 1525 as the "Diocese of Tlaxcala" and retained that name until it was elevated to an archdiocese in 1903. In 1959 a new Diocese of Tlaxcala was created and is suffragan to the Archdiocese of Puebla de los Ángeles.

A separate diocese seated in Mexico City was created in 1530 and replaced the Archdiocese of Seville in Spain as Tlaxcala's metropolitan see in 1546. While its place as Mexico's most important Catholic see was short-lived, the Archdiocese of Puebla de los Ángeles is one of the largest archdioceses in Mexico today. Now a metropolitan see itself, within the ecclesiastical province of Puebla de los Ángeles contains three suffragan dioceses: Huajuapan de León, Tehuacán, and Tlaxcala.

== Leadership ==
=== Bishops of Tlaxcala ===
- Julián Garcés, O.P. (13 October 1525 – 7 December 1542)
- Pablo Gil de Talavera (2 May 1544 – March 1545)
- Martín Sarmiento de Osacastro, O.F.M. (13 June 1548 – 19 October 1557)
- Fernando de Villagómez (27 June 1561 – 10 February 1571)
- Antonio Ruíz de Morales y Molina, O.S. (10 December 1572 – 17 July 1576)
- Diego de Romano y Govea (13 January 1578 – 12 April 1606)
- Alfonso de la Mota y Escobar (12 February 1607 – 16 March 1625)
- Gutiérrez Bernardo de Quirós (22 June 1626 – 9 February 1638)
- Bl. Juan de Palafox y Mendoza (3 October 1639 – 23 November 1653), confirmed Bishop of Osma
- Diego Osorio de Escobar y Llamas (2 August 1655 – 1664), resigned
- Juan de Sancto Mathía Sáenz de Mañozca y Murillo (17 June 1675 Confirmed–Did not take effect)
- Manuel Fernández de Santa Cruz (19 October 1676 – 1 February 1699)
- Ignacio de Urbina, O.S.H. (18 April 1701 – 9 April 1703)
- García Felipe de Legazpi y Velasco Altamirano y Albornoz (14 January 1704 – 6 March 1706)
- Pedro Nogales Dávila (8 June 1707 – 9 July 1721)
- Juan Antonio de Lardizábal y Elorza (23 September 1722 – 18 February 1733)
- Benito Crespo y Monroy, O.S. (20 January 1734 – 19 July 1737)
- Pedro González García (26 January 1739 – 20 May 1743), appointed Bishop of Ávila
- Domingo Pantaleón Álvarez de Abreu (20 May 1743 – 28 November 1763)
- Francisco Fabián y Fuero (4 February 1765 – 13 September 1773), appointed Archbishop of Valencia
- Victoriano López Gonzalo (13 September 1773 – 24 July 1786), appointed Bishop of Tortosa
- Santiago José Hechavarría y Elguesúa (10 March 1788 – 19 January 1789)
- Salvador Biempica y Sotomayor (29 March 1790 – 2 August 1802)
- Manuel Ignacio González de Campillo Gómez del Valle (26 March 1804 – 26 February 1813)
- José Antonio Joaquín Pérez Martínez y Robles (19 December 1814 – 20 April 1829)
- Francisco Pablo Vázquez (25 February 1831 – 7 October 1847)
- José María Luciano Becerra (27 September 1852 – 17 December 1854)
- Pelagio Antonio de Labastida y Dávalos (23 March 1855 – 19 March 1863), appointed Archbishop of Mexico, Federal District
- Carlos María Colina y Rubio (19 March 1863 – 10 March 1879)
- Francisco de Paula Verea y González (19 September 1879 – 4 May 1884)
- José María Mora y Daza (13 November 1884 – 27 December 1887)
- Francisco Melitón Vargas y Gutiérrez (1 June 1888 – 14 September 1896)
- Perfecto Amézquita Gutiérrez, C.M. (3 December 1896 – 27 October 1900)
- Ramón Ibarra y González (13 May 1902 – 11 August 1903 see below)

=== Archbishops of Puebla de los Ángeles ===
- Ramón Ibarra y González (see above 11 August 1903 – 1 February 1917)
- Enrique Sánchez y Paredes (24 January 1919 – 25 March 1923)
- Pedro María Vera y Zuria (2 May 1924 – 28 July 1945)
- José Ignacio Márquez y Tóriz (28 July 1945 – 28 February 1950)
- Octaviano Márquez y Toriz (14 December 1950 – 24 September 1975)
- Ernesto Corripio y Ahumada (11 March 1976 – 19 July 1977), appointed Archbishop of Mexico, Federal District
- Rosendo Huesca Pacheco (28 September 1977 – 5 February 2009), retired
- Víctor Sánchez Espinosa (5 February 2009 – 21 September 2026), retired
- Jorge Carlos Patrón Wong (21 September 2026 – Present)

=== Coadjutor archbishop ===
- José Ignacio Márquez y Tóriz (1934-1945), succeeded here

=== Auxiliary bishops ===
- Francisco Juan Leiza (1739-1747)
- Miguel Anselmo Álvarez de Abreu y Valdéz (1749-1765), appointed Bishop of Antequera, Oaxaca
- Guglielmo Piani, S.D.B. (1921-1922), appointed Apostolic Delegate to the Philippines
- José Ignacio Márquez y Tóriz (1934), appointed Coadjutor Archbishop here
- Emilio Abascal y Salmerón (1953-1968), appointed Archbishop of Xalapa, Veracruz
- Ricardo Guízar Díaz (1970-1977), appointed Auxiliary Bishop of Aguascalientes
- Rosendo Huesca Pacheco (1970-1977), appointed Archbishop here
- Eugenio Lira Rugarcía (2011-2016), appointed Bishop of Matamoros, Tamaulipas
- Dagoberto Sosa Arriaga (2011-2013), appointed Bishop of Tlapa, Guerrero
- Tomás López Durán (2013-Present)
- Rutilo Felipe Pozos Lorenzini (2013-2020), appointed Bishop of Ciudad Obregón, Sonora
- Francisco Javier Martínez Castillo (2023-Present)

=== Other priests of this diocese who became bishops ===
- Joaquín Fernández de Madrid y Canal (1824-1834), appointed Titular Bishop of Tanagra in 1834
- Francisco de Paula Suárez Peredo y Bezares (1848-1863), appointed Bishop of Veracruz-Jalapa in 1863
- Guillermo Tritschler y Córdova (1904-1931), appointed Bishop of San Luis Potosí in 1931
- Luis Munive Escobar (1944-1959), appointed Bishop of Tlaxcala in 1959
- Anselmo Zarza Bernal (1939-1962), appointed Bishop of Linares, Nuevo León in 1962
- Bartolomé Carrasco Briseño (1945-1963), appointed Bishop of Huejutla, Hidalgo in 1963
- Sefafín Vásquez Elizalde (1948-1968), appointed Bishop of Huejutla, Hidalgo in 1968
- José Trinidad Medel Pérez (1955-1986), appointed Bishop of Tula, Hidalgo in 1986
- Miguel Ángel Castro Muñoz (1998-2021), appointed Bishop of Huajuapan de León, Oaxaca in 2021

== See also ==
- List of Roman Catholic archdioceses in México
- Puebla City
- Tlaxcala City
