= Lorenzo Cárdenas Aregullín =

Mexican Roman Catholic prelate (1937–2025)

His Excellency Lorenzo Cárdenas Aregullín
- Bishop Emeritus of Papantla
- Archdiocese: Xalapa
- Diocese: Papantla
- Appointed: 30 October 1980
- Term ended: 2 May 2012
- Predecessor: Genaro Alamilla Arteaga
- Successor: Jorge Carlos Patrón Wong
- Previous posts: Auxiliary Bishop of Tehuacán and Titular Bishop of Crepedula (1978–1980)

Orders
- Ordination: 29 June 1962
- Consecration: 7 May 1978 by Arturo Antonio Szymanski Ramírez, Ernesto Corripio y Ahumada and Rafael Ayala y Ayala

Personal details
- Born: 23 March 1937 Ciudad Victoria, Tamaulipas, Mexico
- Died: 9 November 2025 (aged 88) Teziutlan, Puebla, Mexico

Lorenzo Cárdenas Aregullín (23 March 1937 – 9 November 2025) was a Mexican Roman Catholic prelate. He was auxiliary bishop of Tehuacán from 1978 to 1980 and bishop of Papantla from 1980 to 2012. Cárdenas Aregullín died on 9 November 2025, at the age of 88.

Catholic Church titles
Preceded by Genaro Alamilla Arteaga	Bishop of Papantla; 1980–2012	Succeeded by Jorge Carlos Patrón Wong
Preceded by Hilario Chávez Joya	Titular Bishop of Crepedula; 1978–1980	Succeeded by Pedro Shaw
Preceded by —	Auxiliary Bishop of Tehuacán; 1978–1980	Succeeded by —
