= Roman Catholic Diocese of San Andrés Tuxtla =

Roman Catholic diocese in Mexico

Diocese of San Andrés Tuxtla Dioecesis Sancti Andreae de Tuxtla Diócesis de San Andrés Tuxtla
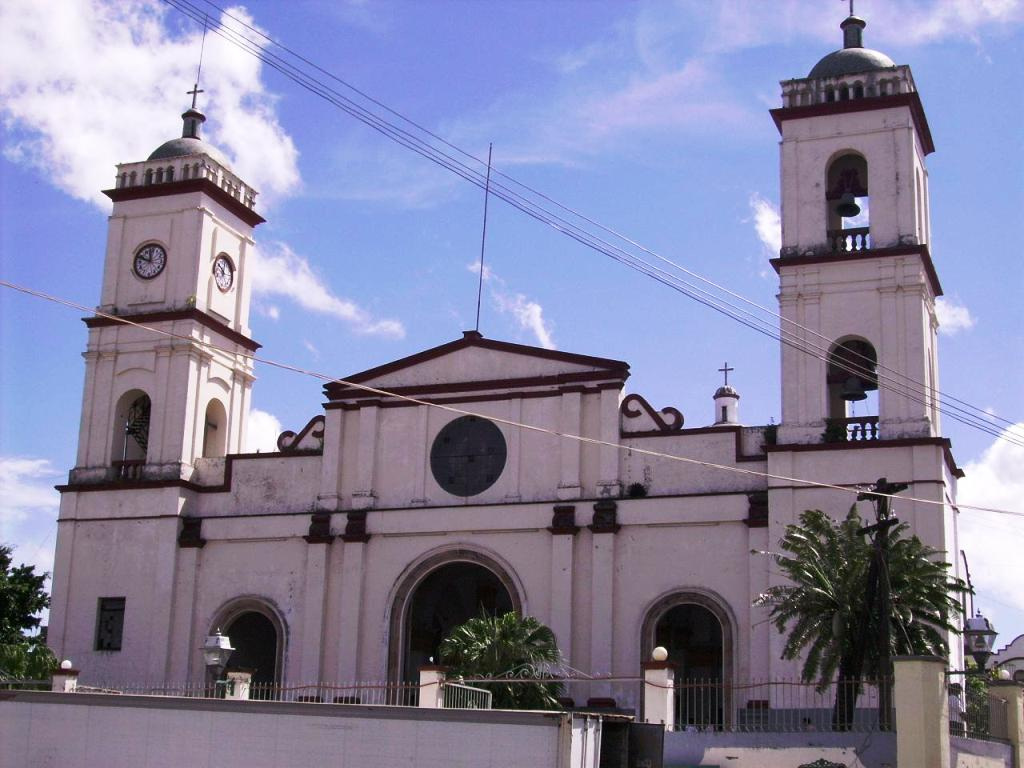
- Catedral de San José y San Andrés

Location
- Country: Mexico
- Ecclesiastical province: Province of Jalapa
- Metropolitan: San Andrés Tuxtla

Statistics
- Area: 5,212 sq mi (13,500 km^{2})
- Population: Total; Catholics: (as of 2010); 1,085,000; 1,010,000 (93.1%)
- Parishes: 56

Information
- Denomination: Roman Catholic
- Rite: Roman Rite
- Established: 23 May 1959 (65 years ago)
- Cathedral: Cathedral of St. Joseph and St. Andrew

Current leadership
- Pope: Francis
- Bishop: José Luis Canto Sosa
- Metropolitan Archbishop: Vacant

Map
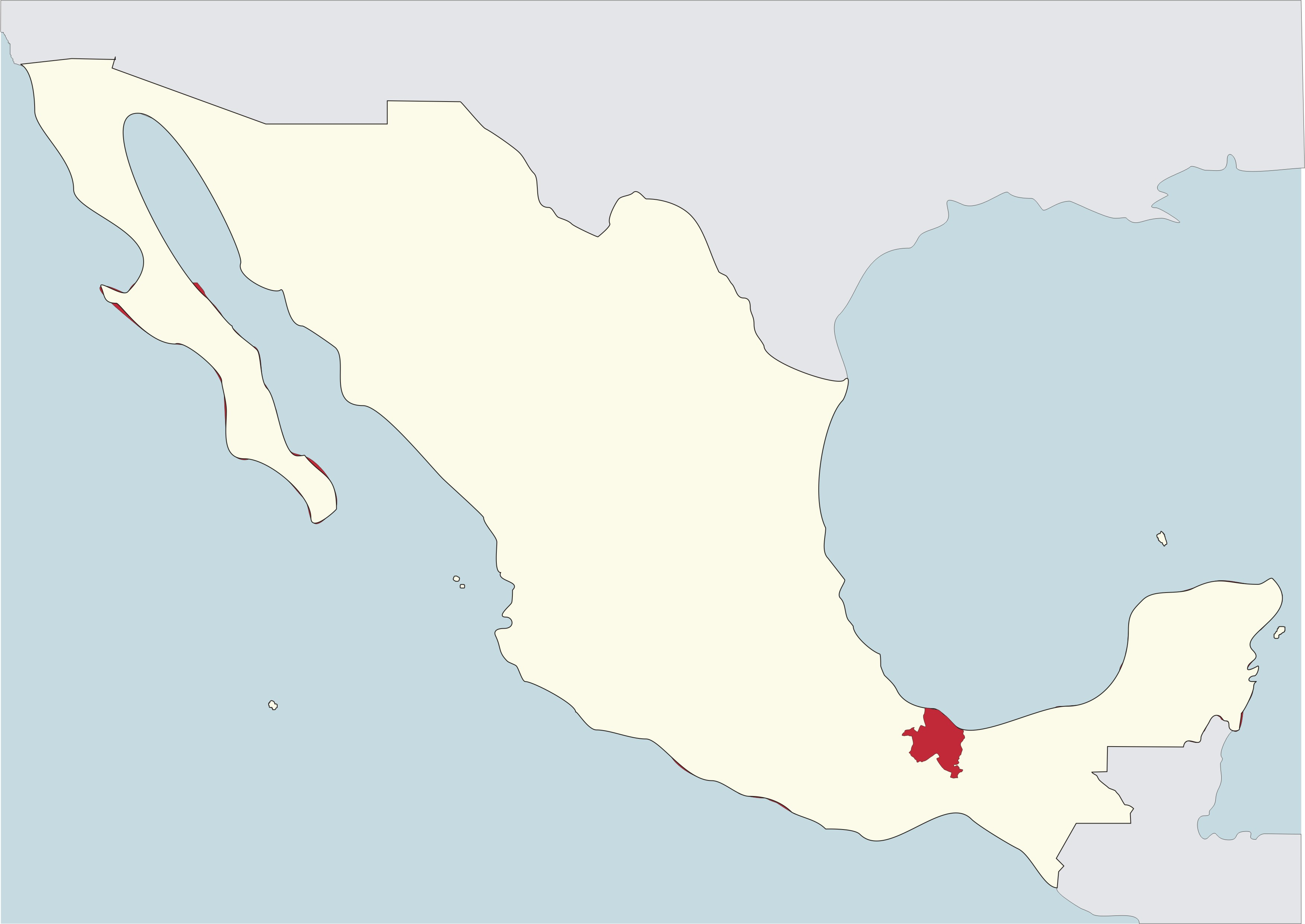

The Roman Catholic Diocese of San Andrés Tuxtla (Latin: Dioecesis Sancti Andreae de Tuxtla) (erected 23 May 1959) is a suffragan diocese of the Archdiocese of Jalapa. In 1962, it lost territory to form the Archdiocese of Jalapa and the Diocese of Veracruz. It also lost territory in 1984 with the formation of the Diocese of Coatzacoalcos.

== Bishops ==
=== Ordinaries ===
- Jesús Villareal y Fierro (1959-1965)
- Arturo Antonio Szymanski Ramírez (1965-1968), appointed Bishop of Tampico, Tamaulipas
- Guillermo Ranzahuer González (1969-2004)
- José Trinidad Zapata Ortiz (2004-2014), appointed Bishop of Papantla, Puebla
- Fidencio López Plaza (2015-2020), appointed Bishop of Querétaro, Querétaro.
- José Luis Canto Sosa (2021-present)

=== Coadjutor bishop ===
- Arturo Antonio Szymanski Ramírez (1960-1965)

== External links and references ==
- "Diocese of San Andrés Tuxtla". Catholic-Hierarchy.
