= Diocese of Papantla =

Latin Catholic jurisdiction in Mexico

Diocese of Papantla Dioecesis Papantlensis Diócesis de Papantla

Location
- Country: Mexico
- Ecclesiastical province: Province of Xalapa

Statistics
- Area: 4,635 sq mi (12,000 km^{2})
- Population: Total; Catholics: (as of 2004); 1,799,648; 1,380,738 (76.6%)
- Parishes: 50

Information
- Denomination: Catholic Church
- Sui iuris church: Latin Church
- Rite: Roman Rite
- Established: 24 November 1922 (103 years ago)
- Cathedral: Cathedral of the Assumption of Our Lady

Current leadership
- Pope: Leo XIV
- Bishop: José Trinidad Zapata Ortiz
- Metropolitan Archbishop: Jorge Carlos Patrón Wong
- Bishops emeritus: Jorge Carlos Patrón Wong

Map
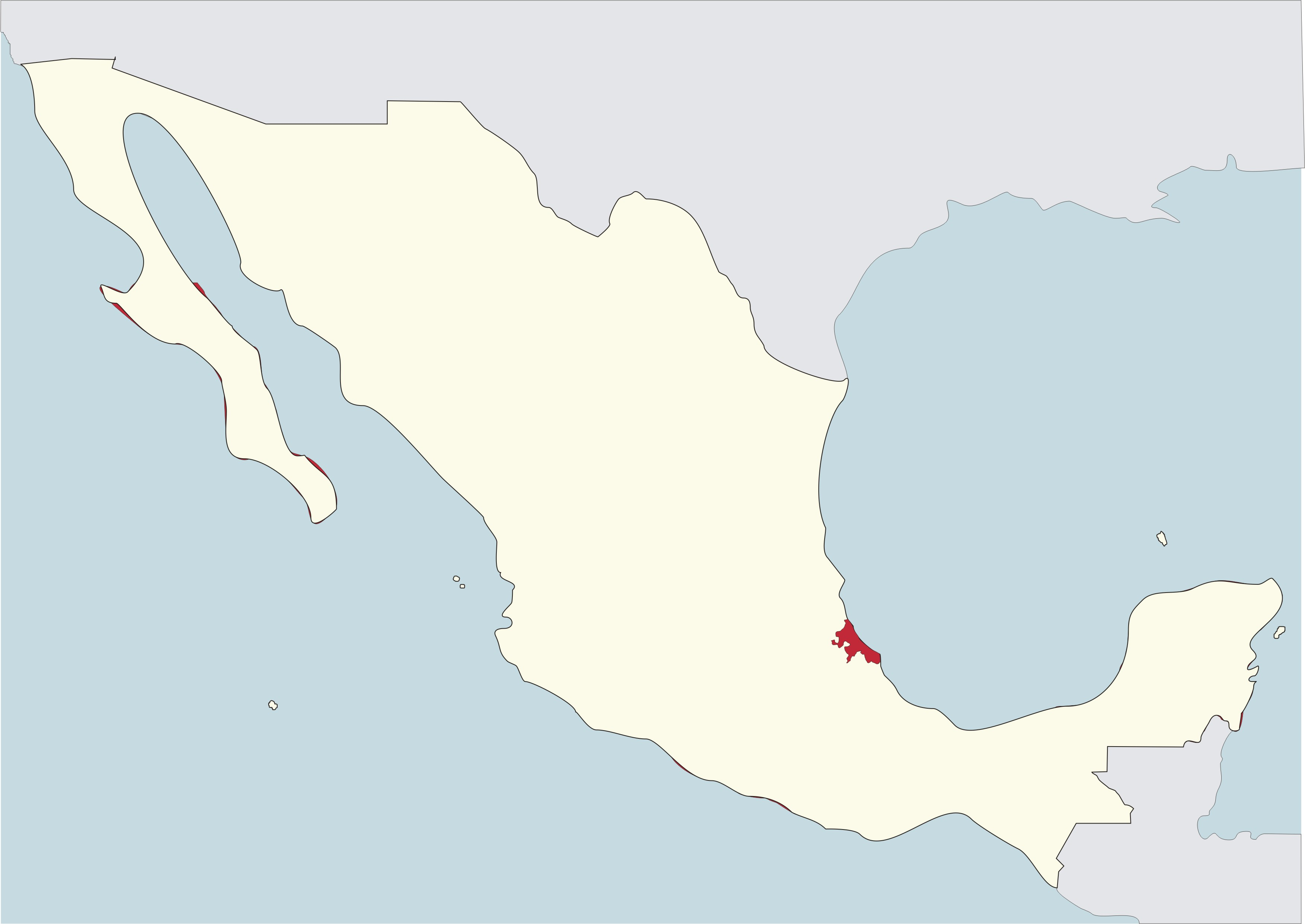

Website
- www.diocesisdepapantla.org.mx

The Diocese of Papantla (Latin: Dioecesis Papantlensis) is a Latin Church ecclesiastical territory or diocese of the Catholic Church in Mexico. It was erected 24 November 1922 and based in the Mexican city of Papantla, Veracruz. The diocese is a suffragan in the ecclesiastical province of the metropolitan Archdiocese of Xalapa. Along with the Dioceses of Huejutla, Tulancingo and Tampico, it lost territory in 1962 to form the Diocese of Tuxpan.

== Bishops ==
=== Ordinaries ===
- Nicolás Corona y Corona (1922–1950)
- Luis Cabrera Cruz (1950–1958), appointed Bishop of San Luis Potosí
- Alfonso Sánchez Tinoco (1959–1970)
- Sergio Obeso Rivera (1971–1974), appointed Coadjutor Archbishop of Jalapa (Xalapa), Veracruz; future Cardinal
- Genaro Alamilla Arteaga (1974–1980)
- Lorenzo Cárdenas Aregullín (1980–2012)
- Jorge Carlos Patron Wong (2012–2013); formerly served as Coadjutor Bishop to Bishop Aregullín; named Secretary of the Congregation for the Clergy on September 21, 2013 and became an archbishop
- José Trinidad Zapata Ortiz (2014-

=== Coadjutor bishop ===
- Jorge Carlos Patrón Wong (2009-2012)

== Episcopal see ==
Teziutlán, Puebla: In 1901, the see was changed to Teziutlán, in Eastern Puebla, near to the border with Veracruz.

== External links and references ==
- "Diocese of Papantla". Catholic-Hierarchy.
