= Norberto Rivera Carrera =

Mexican cardinal

His Eminence Norberto Rivera Carrera
- Cardinal, Archbishop Emeritus of Mexico; Primate Emeritus of Mexico
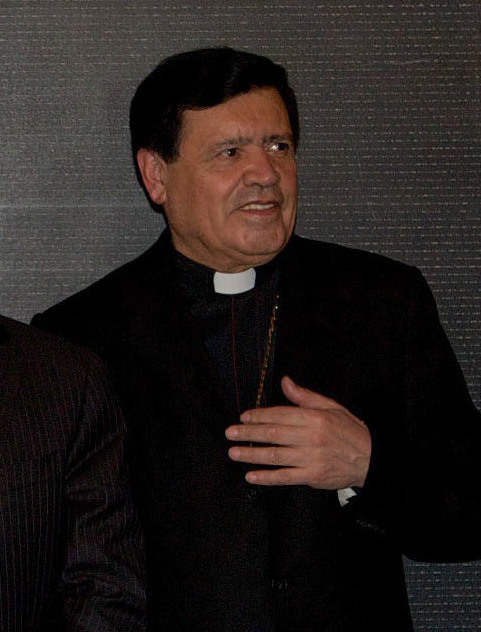
- Church: Catholic Church
- See: Mexico
- Appointed: 13 June 1995
- Retired: 7 December 2017
- Predecessor: Ernesto Corripio y Ahumada
- Successor: Carlos Aguiar Retes
- Other posts: Cardinal Priest of S. Francesco d'Assisi a Ripa Grande; Member of Council for the Economy
- Previous post: Bishop of Tehuacán (1985–1995)

Orders
- Ordination: 3 July 1966 by Pope Paul VI
- Consecration: 21 December 1985 by Antonio López Aviña
- Created cardinal: 21 February 1998 by Pope John Paul II
- Rank: Cardinal-Priest

Personal details
- Born: 6 June 1942 (age 84) La Purísima, Durango, Mexico
- Denomination: Catholic
- Education: Pontifical Gregorian University
- Motto: Lumen gentium ("Light of the nations")
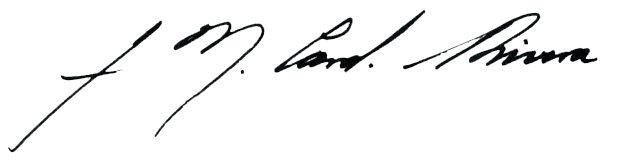
- Signature: Norberto Rivera Carrera's signature

- Coat of arms: Norberto Rivera Carrera's coat of arms

Styles of Norberto Rivera Carrera
- Reference style: His Eminence
- Spoken style: Your Eminence
- Informal style: Cardinal
- See: Mexico

Ordination history of Norberto Rivera Carrera
History
Episcopal consecration
- Consecrated by: Antonio López Aviña (Durango)
- Date: 21 December 1985
Episcopal succession
Bishops consecrated by Norberto Rivera Carrera as principal consecrator
- José de Jesús Martínez Zepeda: 12 April 1997
- Marcelino Hernández Rodríguez: 5 February 1998
- Felipe Tejeda García: 4 March 2000
- José Luis Fletes Santana: 4 March 2000
- Guillermo Rodrigo Teodoro Ortiz Mondragón: 4 March 2000
- Francisco Clavel Gil: 27 June 2001

Norberto Rivera Carrera (born 6 June 1942) is a Mexican prelate of the Catholic Church who was archbishop of Mexico from 1995 to 2017. He was made a cardinal in 1998. He was Bishop of Tehuacán from 1985 to 1995.

== Early life and ministry ==
Norberto Rivera Carrera was born in La Purísima, a small town in Tepehuanes Municipality, to Ramón Rivera Cháidez and Soledad Carrera; he has a sister who is a nun. His father immigrated to the United States to support the family. Rivera entered the seminary of Durango in 1955. He later studied at the Pontifical Gregorian University in Rome, where he obtained his licentiate in theology. He was ordained to the priesthood by Pope Paul VI on 3 July 1966.

From 1967 to 1985, Rivera did pastoral work in Durango and Zacatecas while serving as a professor of dogmatic theology and the prefect of discipline at the Durango seminary. He also directed Social Communications for the Archdiocese of Durango, was the diocesan advisor to the Christian Family Movement, and taught ecclesiology at the Pontifical University of Mexico from 1982 to 1985. While at the Pontifical University, he founded the Movement for the Days of Christian Life.

== Episcopal career ==
On 5 November 1985, Pope John Paul II appointed Rivera Bishop of Tehuacán. Archbishop Antonio López Aviña consecrated him bishop on 21 December with Archbishops Adolfo Suárez Rivera and Rosendo Huesca Pacheco as co-consecrators. He headed the Mexican Episcopal Conference's Commission for the Family from 1989 to 1995 and the Family Section of the Latin American Episcopal Conference from 1993 to 1995.

Rivera was appointed archbishop of Mexico City on 13 June 1995. John Paul II made him cardinal priest of S. Francesco d'Assisi a Ripa Grande in the consistory of 21 February 1998.

In 2001, when Legion of Christ founder Marcial Maciel Degollado faced sexual abuse allegations, Rivera referred to the charges as "a plot." In 2002, Rivera criticized the US media for its coverage of clergy sexual abuse. He called it "an orchestrated plan for striking at the prestige of the Church." He compared it to "what happened in the past century with the persecutions in Mexico, in Spain, in Nazi Germany and in communist countries."

Rivera was one of the cardinal electors who participated in the 2005 papal conclave that elected Pope Benedict XVI. He was mentioned as a possible choice for pope at the time, as he had been years earlier.

Within the Latin American Episcopal Conference, Rivera served as President of the Episcopal Committee of Culture from 2004 to 2006. He is also a member of the Pontifical Council for the Family, the Congregation for the Clergy, and the Congregation for Divine Worship and the Discipline of the Sacraments. He was made a member of the Congregation for Institutes of Consecrated Life in 2014.

In 1996, he forced the resignation of the abbot of the basilica of Our Lady of Guadalupe after he had questioned the historical truth of Mary's appearance to Juan Diego. He denounced the legalization of same-sex marriage and adoption by same-sex couples in 2009 and 2010. He said: "Our children and youth run the grave risk of seeing these types of unions as normal and they can falsely understand that sexual differences are simply a personality type.... Homosexual acts, in effect, close the sexual act to the gift of life. They do not come from a true affective and sexual complementarity."

In 2011, as the Supreme Court of Mexico prepared to deliberate on a ruling proposed by Justice Fernando Franco that would overturn anti-abortion constitutional amendments enacted in numerous Mexican states. Rivera Carrera said that "abortion is never a solution for anything." On 25 September he said: "The Church always reaches out to pregnant women who are being pressured at work, by family members or friends to remind each one of them of the great value of motherhood." He noted that the Mexican bishops emphasized that the "taking of human life through the various abortifacient techniques must not be tolerated, and the taking of the life a human being, even in its initial phases, is not licit."

He was one of the cardinal electors who participated in the 2013 papal conclave that elected Pope Francis.

On 13 February 2016, Francis addressed the bishops of Mexico and appeared to castigate them: "Do not lose time or energy in secondary things, in gossip or intrigue, in conceited schemes of careerism, in empty plans for superiority, in unproductive groups that seek benefits or common interests. Do not allow yourselves to be dragged into gossip and slander." In March, an editorial in the newspaper of the Mexico City Archdiocese defended the bishops and said that the pope had received "bad advice". Observers identified Rivera as both a target of the pope's speech and the source of the editorial response.

=== Sexual abuse case ===
Beginning in 1989, Los Angeles prosecutors pursued a Mexican priest on charges of sexual abuse while he was stationed in the US for more than a decade. A lawsuit filed there charged that as Bishop of Tehuacán and Los Angeles Cardinal, Roger Mahony had shielded a priest abuser. Rivera said that when he approved the priest's transfer to Los Angeles, he had heard "accusations of homosexuality, but not of pedophilia." Rivera asked the Vatican to laicize the priest in 2007.

=== COVID-19 ===
Rivera was admitted to the hospital on 12 January 2021, suffering from COVID-19. His former spokesperson, Hugo Valdemar Romero, said that Rivera was in intensive care and that the archdiocese had refused to pay his expenses. Rivera received the Anointing of the Sick on January 19. Archbishop Carlos Aguiar Retes said that the Archdiocese would pay for Rivera's and other clerics' care in a public hospital "because of the economic situation experienced by the Church throughout the country and in communion and solidarity with what thousands of Mexicans have lived during this pandemic", but Rivera had chosen to leave a public hospital for Hospital Ángeles Mocel, a private hospital. The Archdiocese of Mexico announced in early March that Rivera had left the hospital.

Catholic Church titles
| Preceded by Rafael Ayala y Ayala | Roman Catholic Bishop of Tehuacan; 5 November 1985 – 13 June 1995 | Succeeded by Mario Espinosa Contreras |
| Preceded by Ernesto Corripio Ahumada | Roman Catholic Archbishop of Mexico; 13 June 1995 – 7 December 2017 | Succeeded by Carlos Aguiar Retes |
| Preceded by Laurean Rugambwa | Cardinal Priest of San Francesco d'Assisi a Ripa Grande; 21 February 1998 – present | Incumbent |
