= Diocese of Huejutla =

Roman Catholic diocese in Mexico

Coordinates: 21.1406°N 98.4196°W

Diocese of Huejutla Dioecesis Hueiutlensis Diócesis de Huejutla
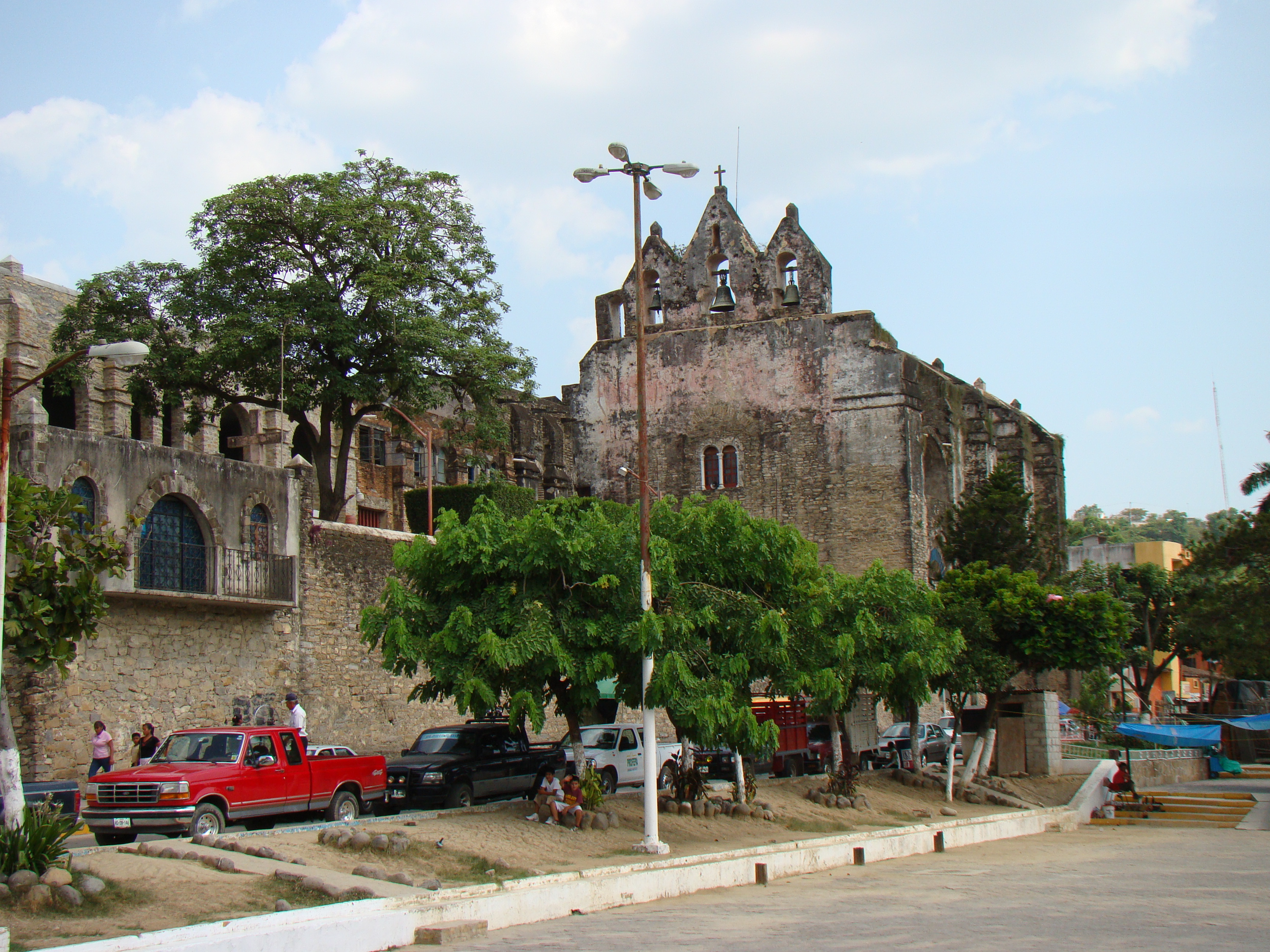
- Huejutla Cathedral

- Coat of arms

Location
- Country: Mexico
- Ecclesiastical province: Province of Tulancingo
- Metropolitan: Huejutla de Reyes

Statistics
- Area: 2,322 sq mi (6,010 km^{2})
- Population: Total; Catholics: (as of 2013); 557,000; 547,000 (98.2%)
- Parishes: 47

Information
- Denomination: Roman Catholic
- Rite: Roman Rite
- Established: 24 November 1922 (103 years ago)
- Cathedral: Cathedral of St. Augustine
- Secular priests: 98

Current leadership
- Pope: Leo XIV
- Bishop: Jose Hirais Acosta Beltran
- Metropolitan Archbishop: Domingo Díaz Martínez

Map

Website
- diocesisdehuexotla.galeon.com

The Roman Catholic Diocese of Huejutla (Latin: Dioecesis Hueiutlensis) (erected 24 November 1922) is a suffragan diocese of the Archdiocese of Tulancingo. It is centred on the Mexican city of Huejutla de Reyes, Hidalgo.

== Ordinaries ==
- José de Jesús Manríquez y Zárate (1922 - 1939)
- Manuel Jerónimo Yerena y Camarena (1940 - 1963)
- Bartolomé Carrasco Briseño (1963 - 1967)
- Sefafín Vásquez Elizalde (1968 - 1977)
- Juan de Dios Caballero Reyes (1978 - 1993)
- Salvador Martínez Pérez (1994 - 2009)
- Salvador Rangel Mendoza, O.F.M. (2009 - 2015)
- José Hiraís Acosta Beltrán (2016–Present)

== Territorial losses ==
Year	Along with	To form
1960	Diocese of San Luis Potosí	Diocese of Ciudad Valles
1962	Diocese of Papantla; Diocese of Tulancingo; Diocese of Tampico	Diocese of Tuxpan

== External links and references ==
- "Diocese of Huejutla". Catholic-Hierarchy.
