= Salvador Martínez Pérez =

Mexican Roman Catholic bishop (1933–2019)

Salvador Martínez Pérez (26 February 1933 – 2 January 2019) was a Mexican Roman Catholic bishop.

== Biography ==
Martínez Pérez was born in Mexico and was ordained to the priesthood in 1960. He served as bishop of the Roman Catholic Diocese of Huejutla, Mexico, from 1994 to 2009.
