= Diocese of Córdoba (Mexico) =

Roman Catholic diocese in Mexico

Coordinates: 18.8934°N 96.9341°W

Diocese of Córdoba Dioecesis Cordubensis in Mexico Diócesis de Córdoba
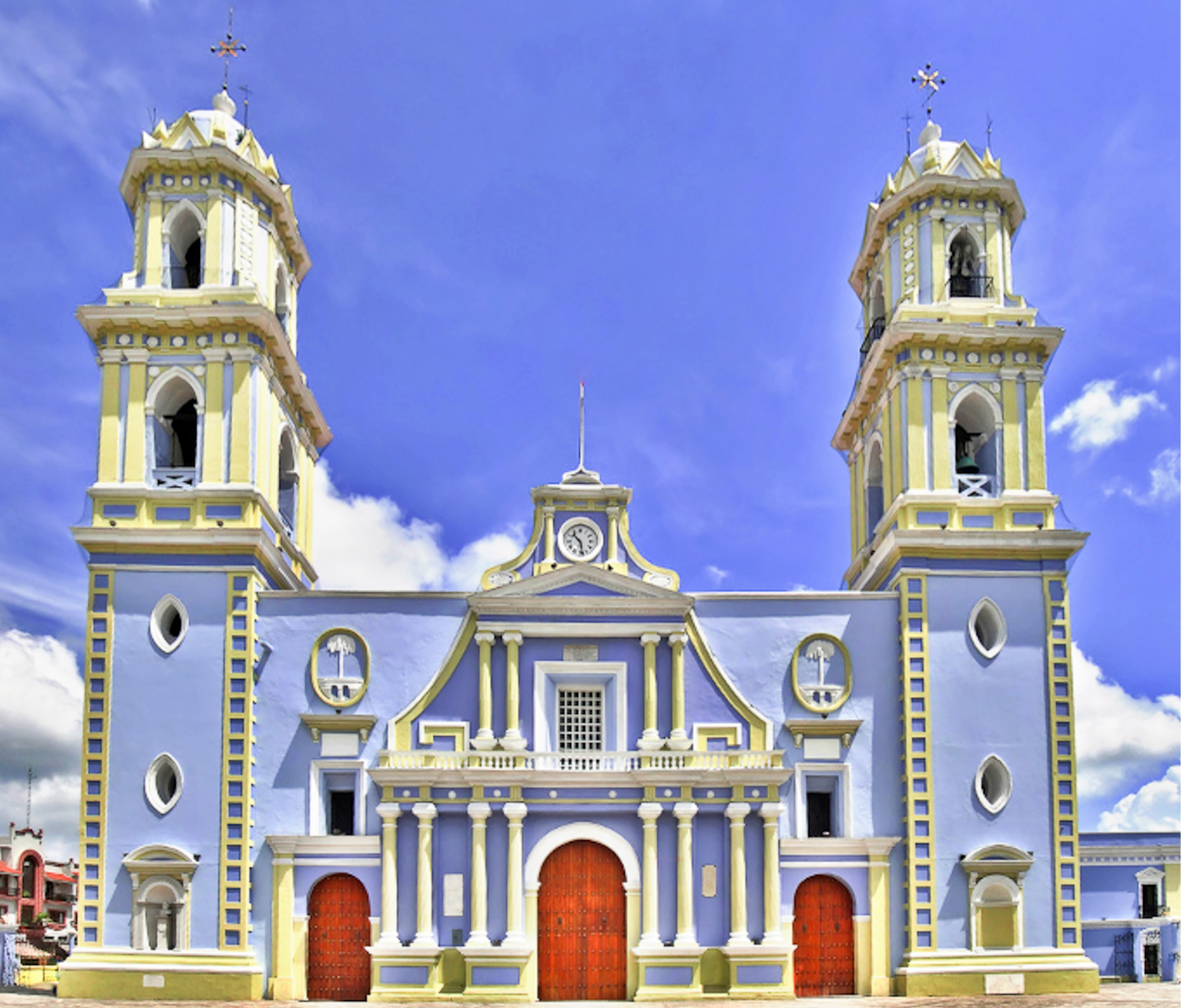
- Catedral de la Inmaculada Concepción

Location
- Country: Mexico
- Ecclesiastical province: Province of Jalapa
- Metropolitan: Córdoba, Veracruz

Statistics
- Area: 1,627 sq mi (4,210 km^{2})
- Population: Total; Catholics: (as of 2006); 707,542; 650,938 (92%)
- Parishes: 39

Information
- Denomination: Roman Catholic
- Rite: Roman Rite
- Established: 15 April 2000 (25 years ago)
- Cathedral: Cathedral of the Immaculate Conception

Current leadership
- Pope: Leo XIV
- Bishop: Eduardo Cirilo Carmona Ortega, CORC
- Metropolitan Archbishop: Vacant
- Bishops emeritus: Eduardo Porfirio Patiño Leal

Map
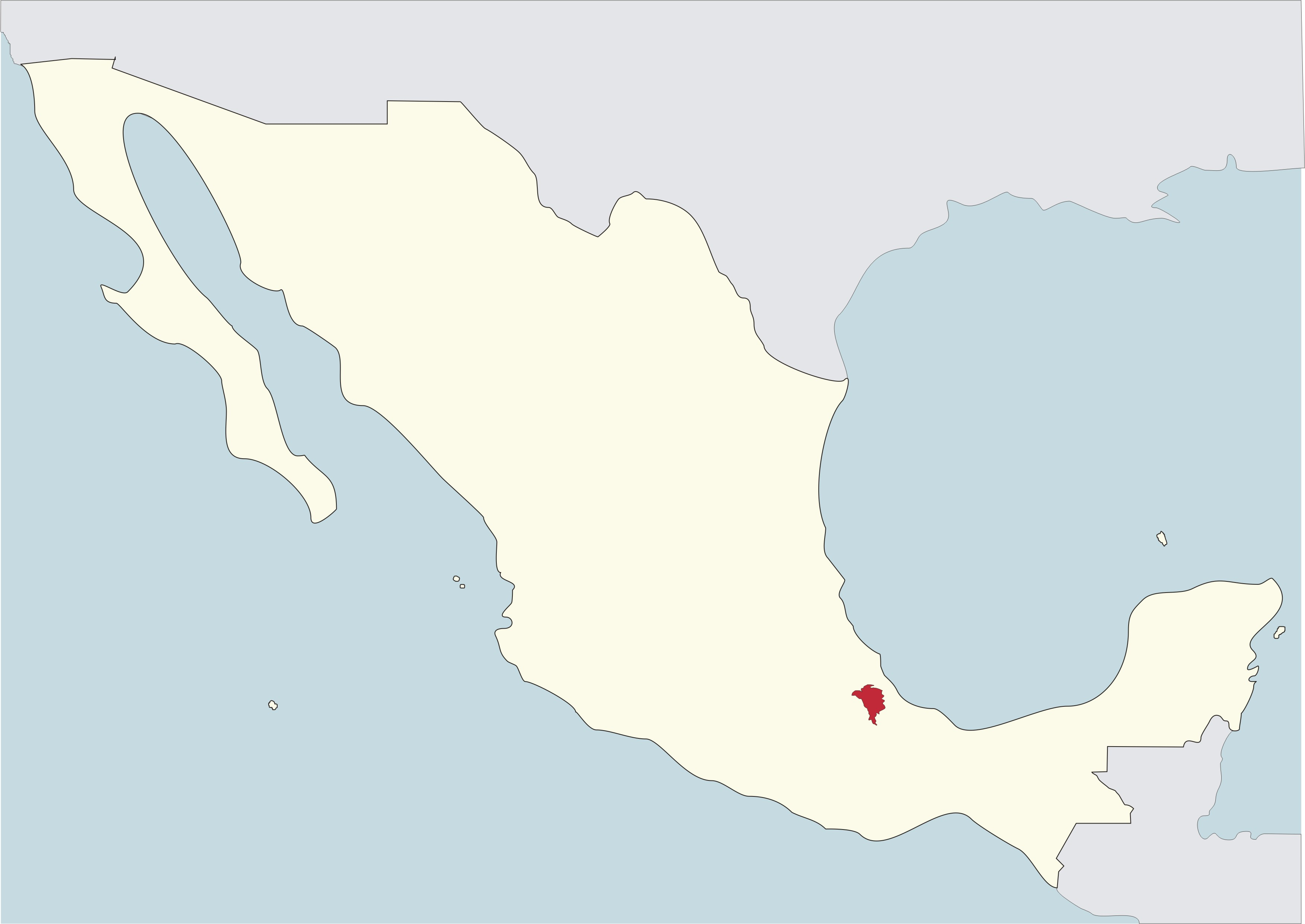

Website
- diocesisdecordoba.org.mx

The Roman Catholic Diocese of Córdoba in Mexico (Latin: Dioecesis Cordubensis in Mexico) is a diocese of the Catholic Church seated in Córdoba, Veracruz. It was established on 15 April 2000. It is a suffragan diocese of the Archdiocese of Jalapa.

== Bishops ==
- Eduardo Porfirio Patiño Leal (15 April 2000 - 4 July 2020)
- Eduardo Cirilo Carmona Ortega, C.O.R.C. (4 July 2020 – present)
