= San Andrés Tuxtla Cathedral =

Coordinates: 18.4486°N 95.2119°W

Cathedral of St. Joseph and St. Andrew
- Catedral de San José y San Andrés de San Andrés Tuxtla
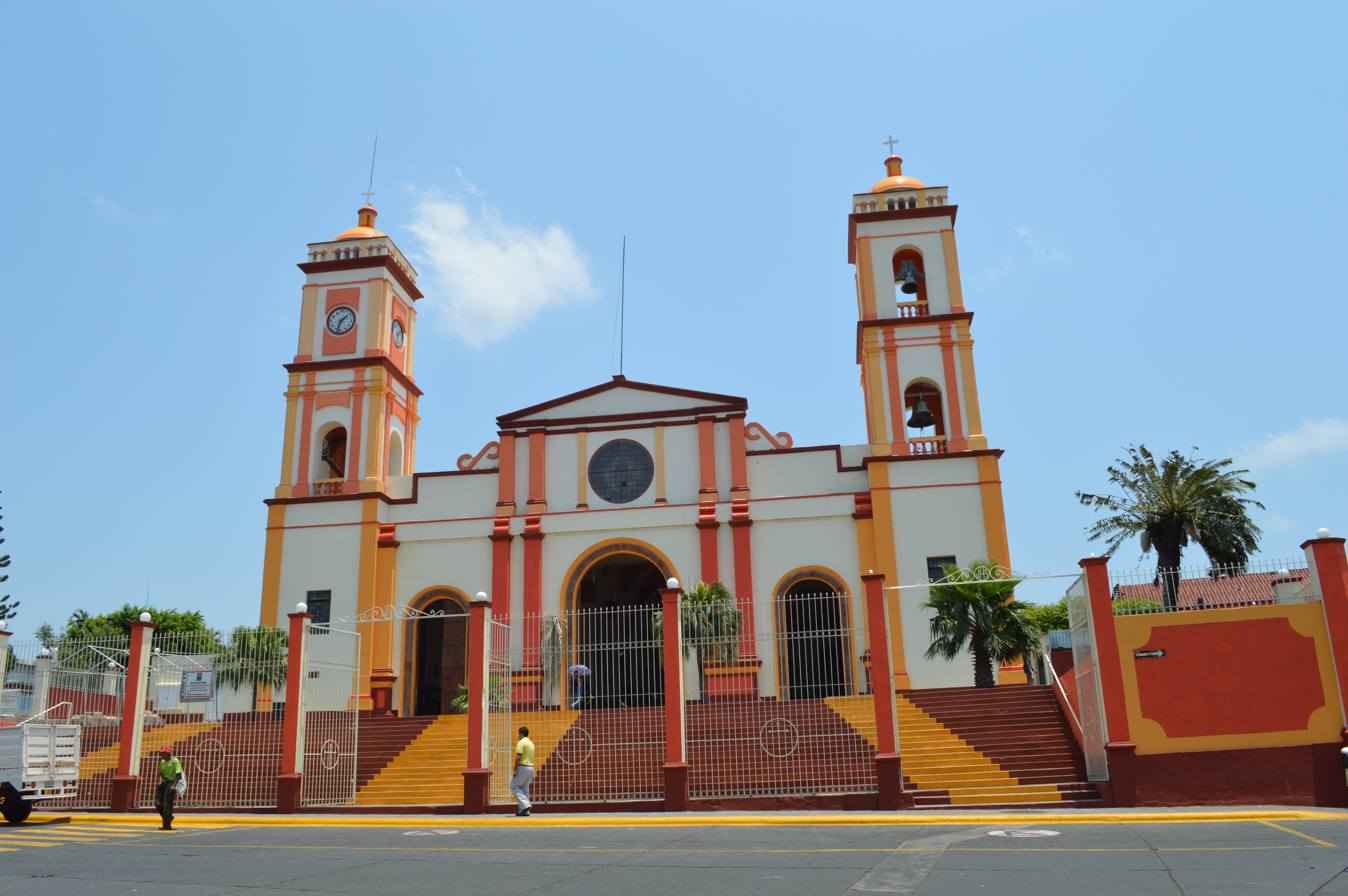
- Cathedral of St. Joseph and St. Andrew
- Location: San Andrés Tuxtla
- Country: Mexico
- Denomination: Roman Catholic Church

Administration
- Diocese: Roman Catholic Diocese of San Andrés Tuxtla

The St. Joseph and St. Andrew Cathedral (also San Andrés Tuxtla Cathedral; Spanish: Catedral de San José y San Andrés de San Andrés Tuxtla) is a Catholic church in the Diocese of San Andrés Tuxtla located in the city of San Andrés Tuxtla, in Veracruz, Mexico. It dominates the center of the town with its two towering sotaventino Colonial-style towers. The beginning of its construction dates to the late nineteenth and mid-twentieth century.

Its construction spans almost 100 years, mainly due to the lack of resources in the process, with a woman named Concepción Sedas being a strong promoter of its completion in 1950. Both the interior and the exterior are painted in light colors. Inside is the chapel of the Holy Sacrament where the remains of the bishop Guillermo Ranzahuer González are located.

Four bishops have exercised their pastoral work in this diocese. The cathedral was consecrated by Don Jesús Villareal y Fierro on January 7, 1950, and was completed with the contributions of the faithful and religious.

== See also ==
- Roman Catholicism in Mexico
- St. Joseph's Cathedral

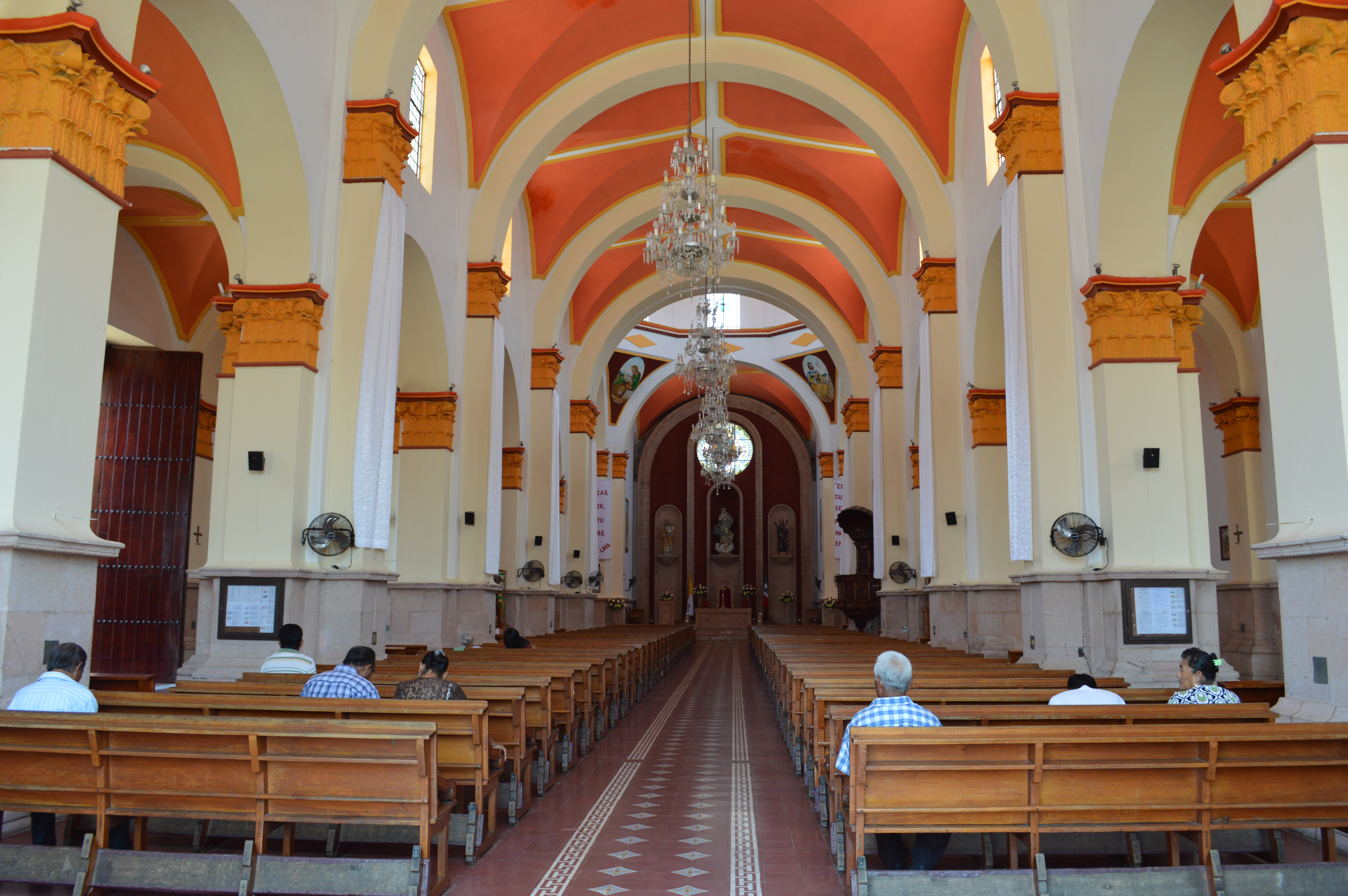
Internal view
