= Diocese of Tlaxcala =

Latin Catholic jurisdiction in Mexico

Diocese of Tlaxcala Dioecesis Tlaxcalensis Diócesis de Tlaxcala
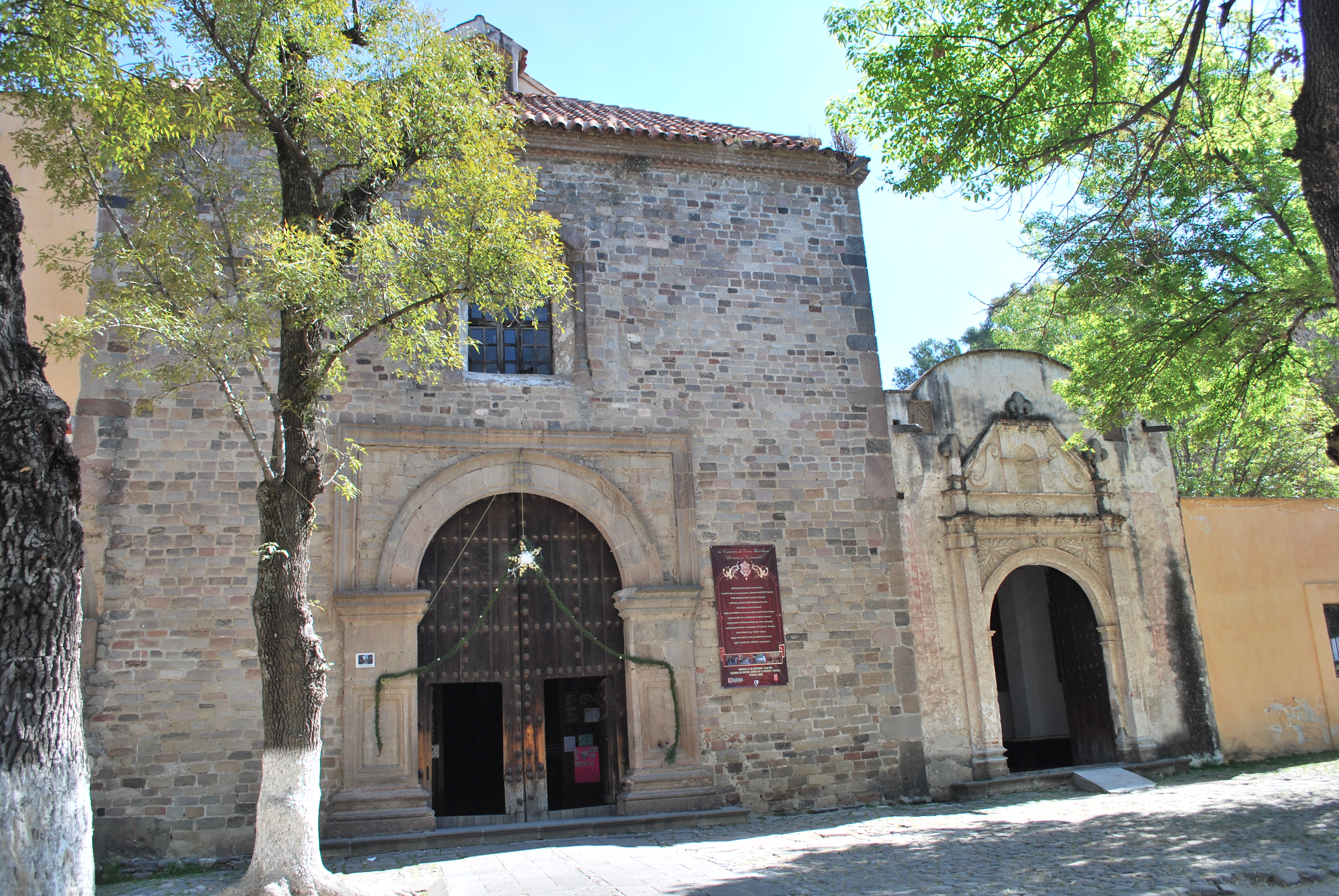
- Catedral de Nuestra Señora de la Asunción

Location
- Country: Mexico
- Ecclesiastical province: Puebla de los Ángeles

Statistics
- Area: 1,568 sq mi (4,060 km^{2})
- Population: Total; Catholics: (as of 2010); 1,077,000; 1,055,000 (98%)
- Parishes: 76

Information
- Denomination: Catholic Church
- Sui iuris church: Latin Church
- Rite: Roman Rite
- Established: 23 May 1959 (67 years ago)
- Cathedral: Cathedral of Our Lady of the Assumption

Current leadership
- Pope: Leo XIV
- Bishop: Julio César Salcedo Aquino
- Metropolitan Archbishop: Victor Sánchez Espinosa

Map
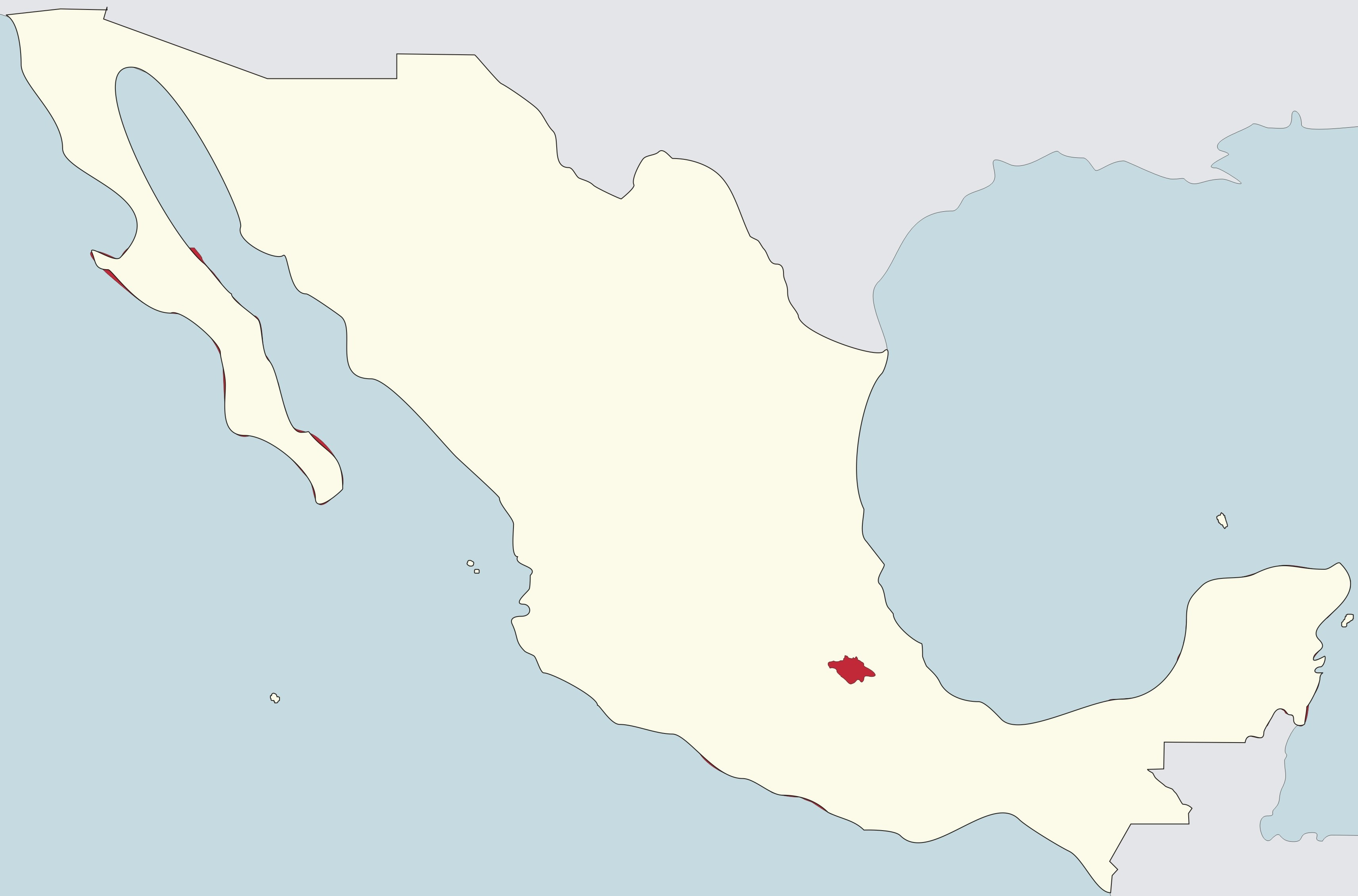

The Diocese of Tlaxcala (Latin: Dioecesis Tlaxcalensis) is a Latin Church ecclesiastical territory or diocese of the Catholic Church in Mexico. It is a suffragan in the ecclesiastical province of the metropolitan Archdiocese of Puebla de los Ángeles, which was itself officially named the "Diocese of Tlaxcala" until 1903 (founded in 1519 and so named in 1525, the oldest diocese in Mexico). The present Diocese of Tlaxcala was erected on 23 May 1959 from territory of that archdiocese and the adjacent Archdiocese of Mexico. Its cathedra is found within the Cathedral of Our Lady of the Assumption in the episcopal see of Tlaxcala.

== Bishops ==
=== Ordinaries ===
- Luis Munive Escobar (1959–2001)
- Jacinto Guerrero Torres (2001–2006)
- Francisco Moreno Barrón (2008–2016)
- Julio César Salcedo Aquino, M.J. (2017–)

=== Coadjutor bishop ===
- Jacinto Guerrero Torres (1991–2001)
