= Ocotlán, Tlaxcala =

Ocotlán
- City
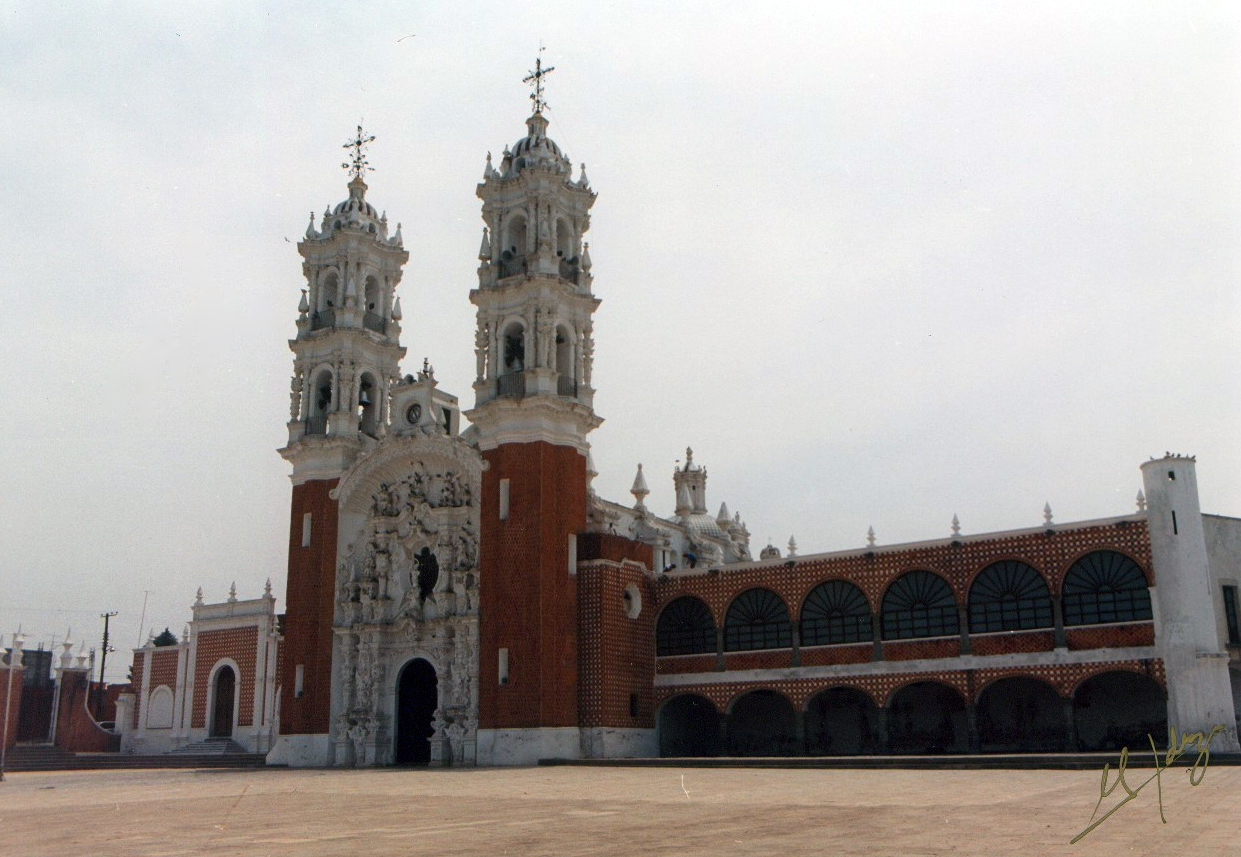
- Basilica of Ocotlán

- Location within Tlaxcala Location within Mexico
- Coordinates: 19°19′00″N 98°13′42″W
- Country: Mexico
- State: Tlaxcala
- Municipality: Tlaxcala
- Elevation: 2,280 m (7,480 ft)

Population (2005)
  - Total: 22,082
- Time zone: UTC-6 (CST)
- Postal code: 90100
- Area code: 246

Ocotlán (from the Nahuatl ocotl ("pine tree"), meaning "place of pines") is a city in the Mexican state of Tlaxcala, located in the centre of that state within the conurbation of the state capital, Tlaxcala de Xicohténcatl.

The Basilica of Ocotlán, dedicated to the Virgin of Ocotlán, a 1541 Marian apparition, is a site of Roman Catholic pilgrimage.

In the 2005 INEGI census, Ocotlán reported a population of 22,082, making it the largest settlement in the municipality of Tlaxcala: more populous even than the state capital, which reported 15,777.
