= José Ignacio Suárez Peredo y Bezares =

José Ignacio Suárez Peredo y Bezares (born 1834 in Orizaba) was a Mexican clergyman and bishop for the Roman Catholic Archdiocese of Xalapa. He was ordained in 1856. He was appointed bishop in 1887. He died in 1894.
