= Tlaxcala Cathedral =

Our Lady of the Assumption Cathedral
- Catedral de Nuestra Señora de la Asunción
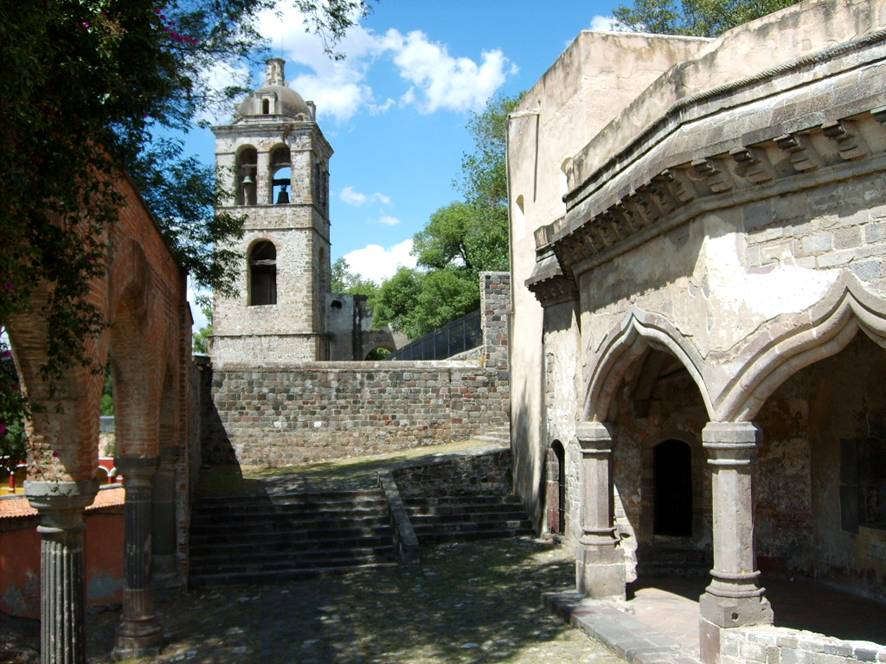
- Open chapel and bell tower
- Our Lady of the Assumption Cathedral
- 19°18′50″N 98°14′16″W
- Location: Tlaxcala
- Country: Mexico
- Denomination: Roman Catholic Church

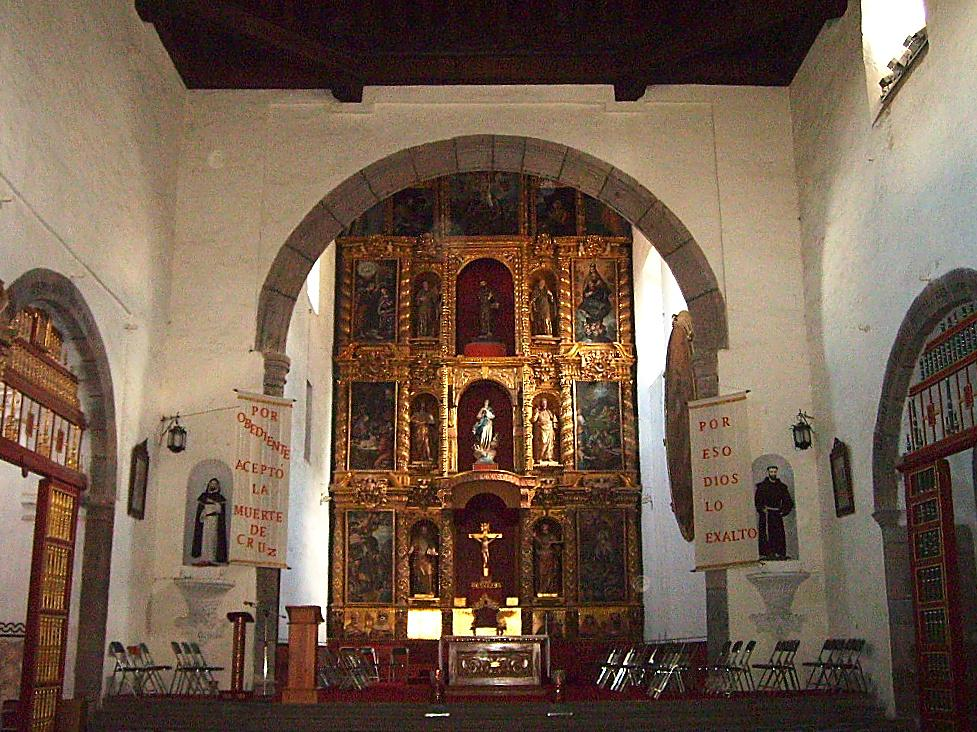
Internal View

Miserere Mei, Deus being performed in the Cathedral by Ensamble Escénico Vocal, November 2021

The Cathedral of Our Lady of the Assumption, (Spanish: Catedral de Nuestra Señora de la Asunción) also Tlaxcala de Xicohténcatl Cathedral, is the main Catholic church in the city of Tlaxcala, Mexico. It was first known as the Temple of St. Francis of Assisi (Templo de San Francisco de Asís), however, when the Diocese began to rise, it was decided to name the cathedral and as it is commonly known; Dedicated as a cathedral under the invocation of Our Lady of the Assumption during the erection of the diocese of Tlaxcala.

Built in the sixteenth century between 1530 and 1536 according to Diego Muñoz Camargo, the temple is a single nave, with wooden roofing, and the deck is of viguería, adorned by a magnificent paneled wooden Mudejar style, Very well preserved and in fact one of the last of its kind that still remain in the American continent. The dome of the temple is octagonal and with a convent as part of its grounds.

In 2021, at the 44th session of the World Heritage Committee, the Cathedral was added as the fifteenth location of the "Monasteries on the slopes of Popocatépetl" UNESCO World Heritage Site.

== See also ==
- Roman Catholic Diocese of Tlaxcala
- Roman Catholicism in Mexico
- Our Lady of the Assumption
