= José Guadalupe Padilla Lozano =

Mexican prelate

- Bishop of Diocese of Veracruz Emeritus
- Church: Roman Catholic Church
- See: Diocese of Veracruz
- In office: 1963 - 2000
- Predecessor: None
- Successor: Luis Gabriel Cuara Méndez

Orders
- Ordination: April 20, 1946

Personal details
- Born: December 12, 1920 San Miguel El Alto, Mexico
- Died: September 9, 2013 (aged 92)

José Guadalupe Padilla Lozano (December 12, 1920 – September 8, 2013) was a Mexican prelate of the Roman Catholic Church.

Lozano was born in San Miguel El Alto, Mexico and ordained a priest on April 20, 1946, from the Archdiocese of Guadalajara. Lozano was appointed the first bishop of newly created Diocese of Veracruz on January 15, 1963, and ordained bishop on March 19, 1963. Lozano served the Diocese of Veracruz until his retirement on February 18, 2000.
