= Diocese of Tehuacán =

Latin Catholic jurisdiction in Mexico

Diocese of Tehuacán Dioecesis Tehuacaniensis Diócesis de Tehuacán
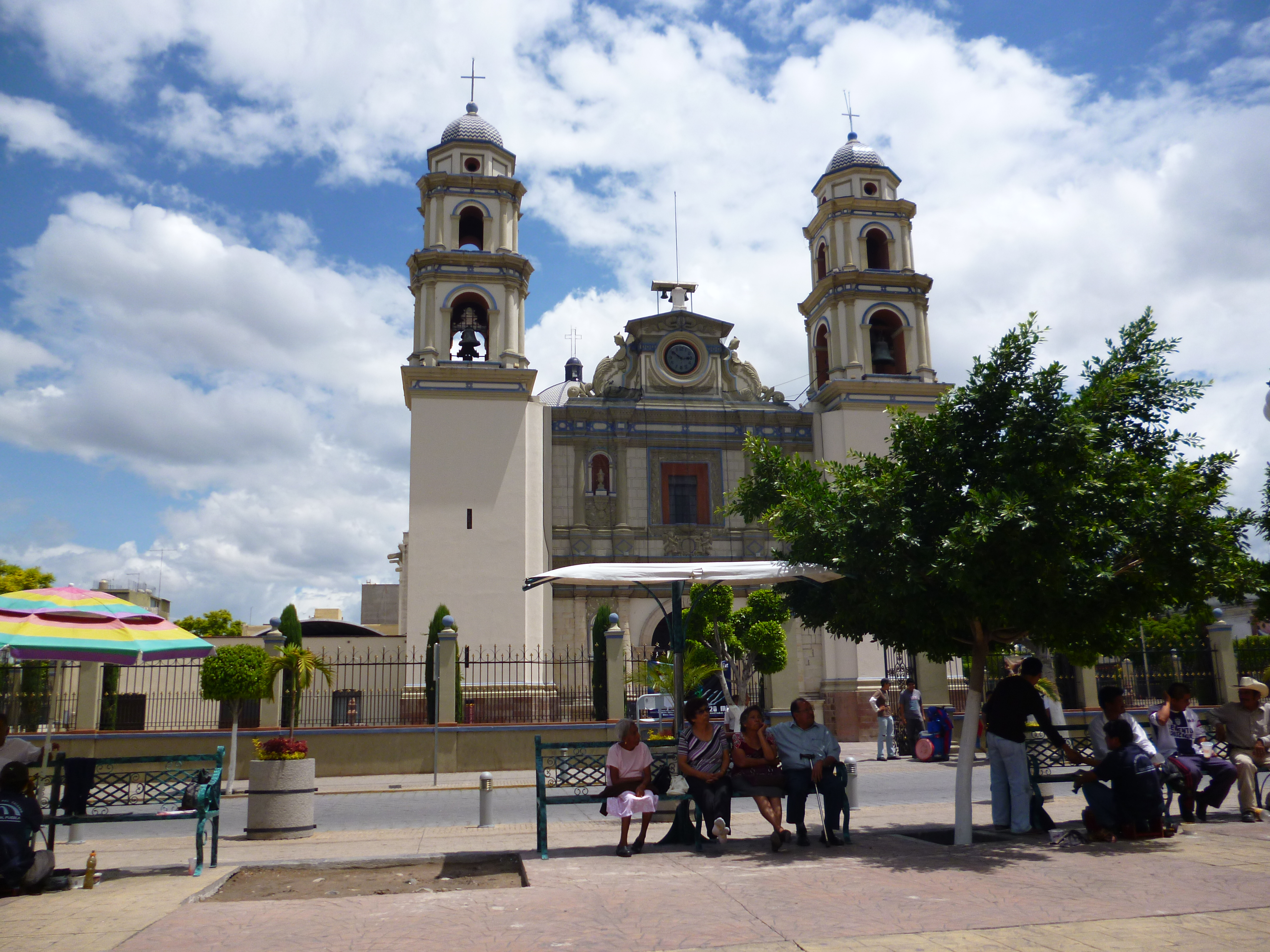

Location
- Country: Mexico
- Ecclesiastical province: Puebla de los Ángeles

Statistics
- Area: 2,431 sq mi (6,300 km^{2})
- Population: Total; Catholics: (as of 2010); 1,017,000; 962,000 (94.6%)
- Parishes: 57

Information
- Denomination: Catholic Church
- Sui iuris church: Latin Church
- Rite: Roman Rite
- Established: 13 January 1962 (63 years ago)
- Cathedral: Cathedral of the Immaculate Conception of Mary

Current leadership
- Pope: Leo XIV
- Bishop: Gonzalo Alonso Calzada Guerrero
- Metropolitan Archbishop: Victor Sánchez Espinosa

The Diocese of Tehuacán (Latin: Dioecesis Tehuacaniensis) is a Latin Church ecclesiastical territory or diocese of the Catholic Church in Mexico. It is a suffragan in the ecclesiastical province of the metropolitan Archdiocese of Puebla de los Angeles. The Diocese of Tehuacán was erected on 13 January 1962. Its cathedra is found within the Cathedral of the Immaculate Conception of Mary in the episcopal see of Tehuacán, Puebla.

== Bishops ==
=== Ordinaries ===
- Rafael Ayala y Ayala (1962 -1985)
- Norberto Rivera Carrera (1985 -1995), appointed Archbishop of México, Federal District; elevated to Cardinal in 1998
- Mario Espinosa Contreras (1996 -2005), appointed Bishop of Mazatlán, Sinaloa
- Rodrigo Aguilar Martínez (2006 -2017), appointed Bishop of San Cristóbal de Las Casas, Chiapas
- Gonzalo Alonso Calzada Guerrero (2018 - )

=== Auxiliary bishop ===
- Lorenzo Cárdenas Aregullín (1978–1980), appointed Bishop of Papantla, Puebla

== External links and references ==
- "Diocese of Tehuacán". Catholic-Hierarchy.
