= Diocese of Orizaba =

Roman Catholic diocese in Mexico

Diocese of Orizaba Dioecesis Orizabensis Diócesis de Orizaba
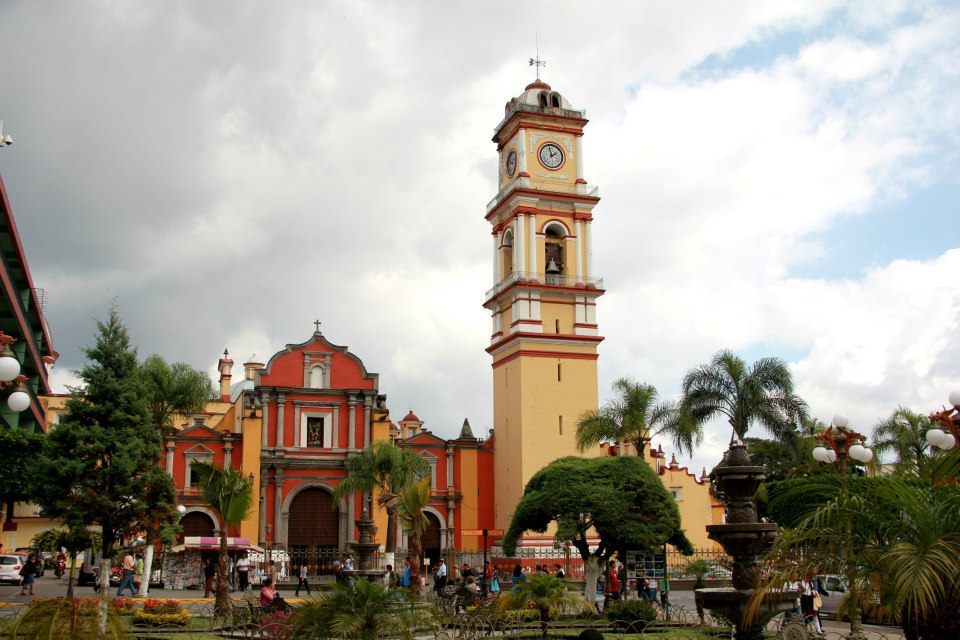
- Catedral de San Miguel Arcangel

Location
- Country: Mexico
- Ecclesiastical province: Province of Jalapa
- Metropolitan: Orizaba, Veracruz

Statistics
- Area: 777 sq mi (2,010 km^{2})
- Population: Total; Catholics: (as of 2003); 551,010; 498,648 (90.5%)
- Parishes: 40

Information
- Denomination: Roman Catholic
- Rite: Roman Rite
- Established: 15 April 2000 (26 years ago)
- Cathedral: Cathedral of St. Michael the Archangel
- Patron saint: Saint Michael the Archangel

Current leadership
- Pope: Leo XIV
- Bishop: Francisco Eduardo Cervantes Merino
- Metropolitan Archbishop: Vacant

Map
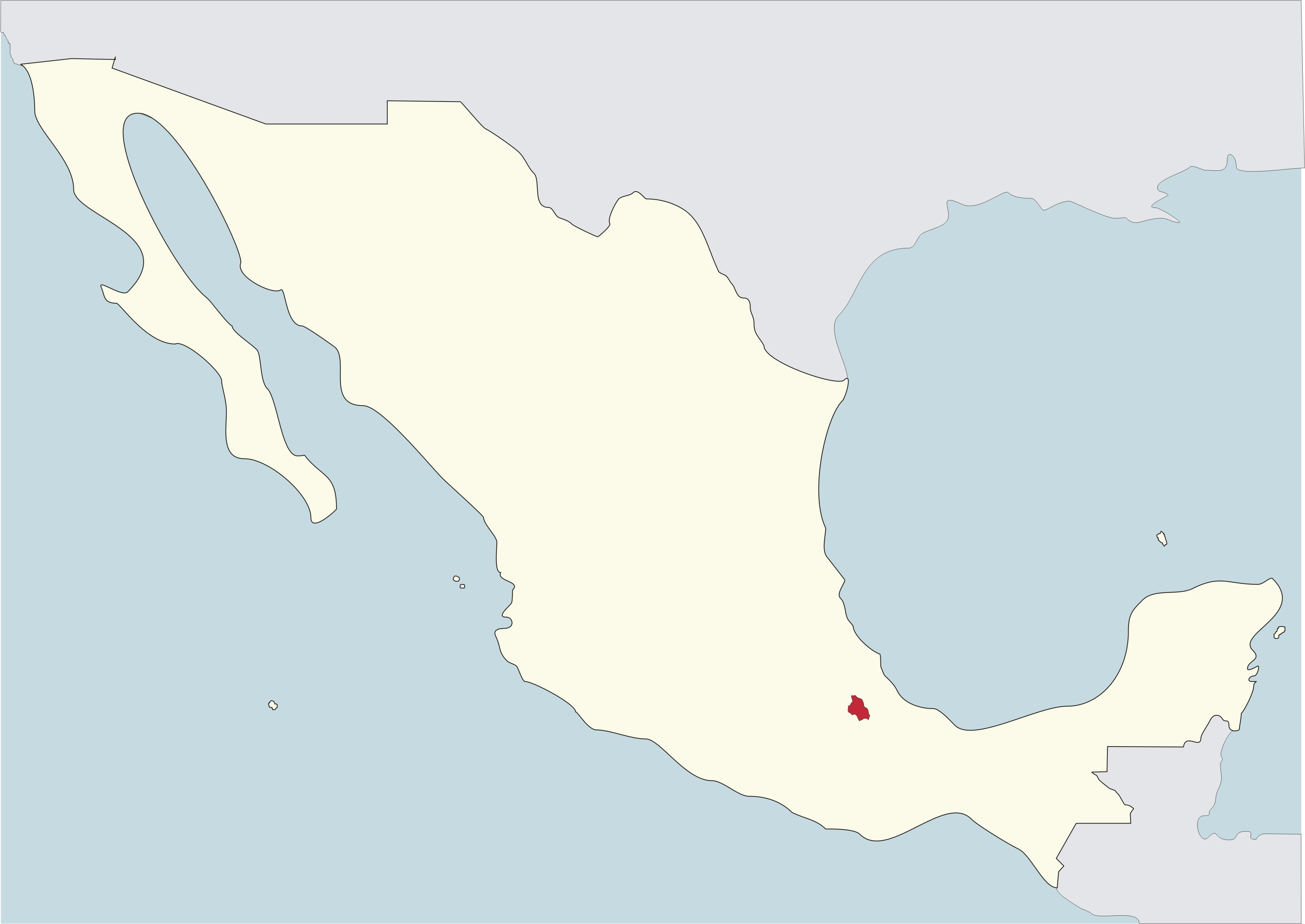

Website
- www.diocesisdeorizaba.com

The Roman Catholic Diocese of Orizaba (Latin: Dioecesis Orizabensis) (erected 15 April 2000) is a suffragan diocese of the Archdiocese of Xalapa.

== Ordinaries ==
- Hipólito Reyes Larios (2000 - 2007), appointed Archbishop of Jalapa (Xalapa), Veracruz
- Marcelino Hernández Rodríguez (2008 - 2013); named Bishop of the Roman Catholic Diocese of Colima, based in Colima, Mexico, by Pope Francis on Monday, November 11, 2013
- Francisco Eduardo Cervantes Merino (2015 - )

== Episcopal See ==
- Orizaba, Veracruz

== External links and references ==
- "Diocese of Orizaba". Catholic-Hierarchy.
