= Orizaba Cathedral =

Coordinates: 18.8495°N 97.1050°W

St. Michael the Archangel Cathedral
- Catedral de San Miguel Arcangel
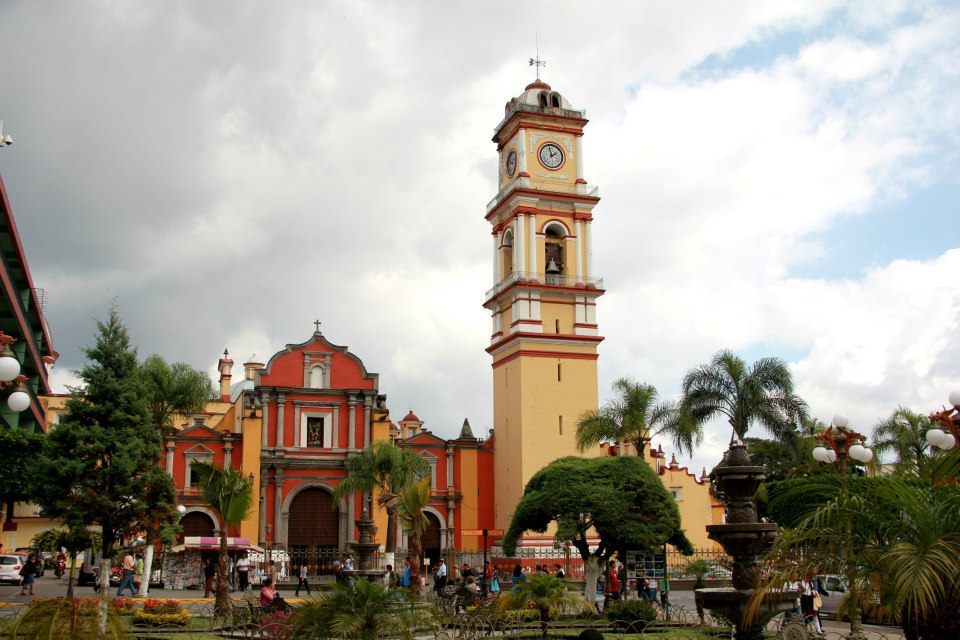
- St. Michael the Archangel Cathedral
- Location: Orizaba
- Country: Mexico
- Denomination: Roman Catholic Church

The St. Michael the Archangel Cathedral (also Orizaba Cathedral; Spanish: Catedral de San Miguel Arcangel) is the main Catholic church of the city of Orizaba in the state of Veracruz and of the Diocese of Orizaba in Mexico.

It was established thanks to the Franciscans at the end of the seventeenth century in 1692, which marks their arrival in the city. It is located in the center of the city and is considered one of the most beautiful in Mexico.

It is known for its details in Baroque and Neoclassical styles as well as the chapels annexed to the building, constructed in the eighteenth century.

== See also ==
- Roman Catholicism in Mexico
- St. Michael the Archangel

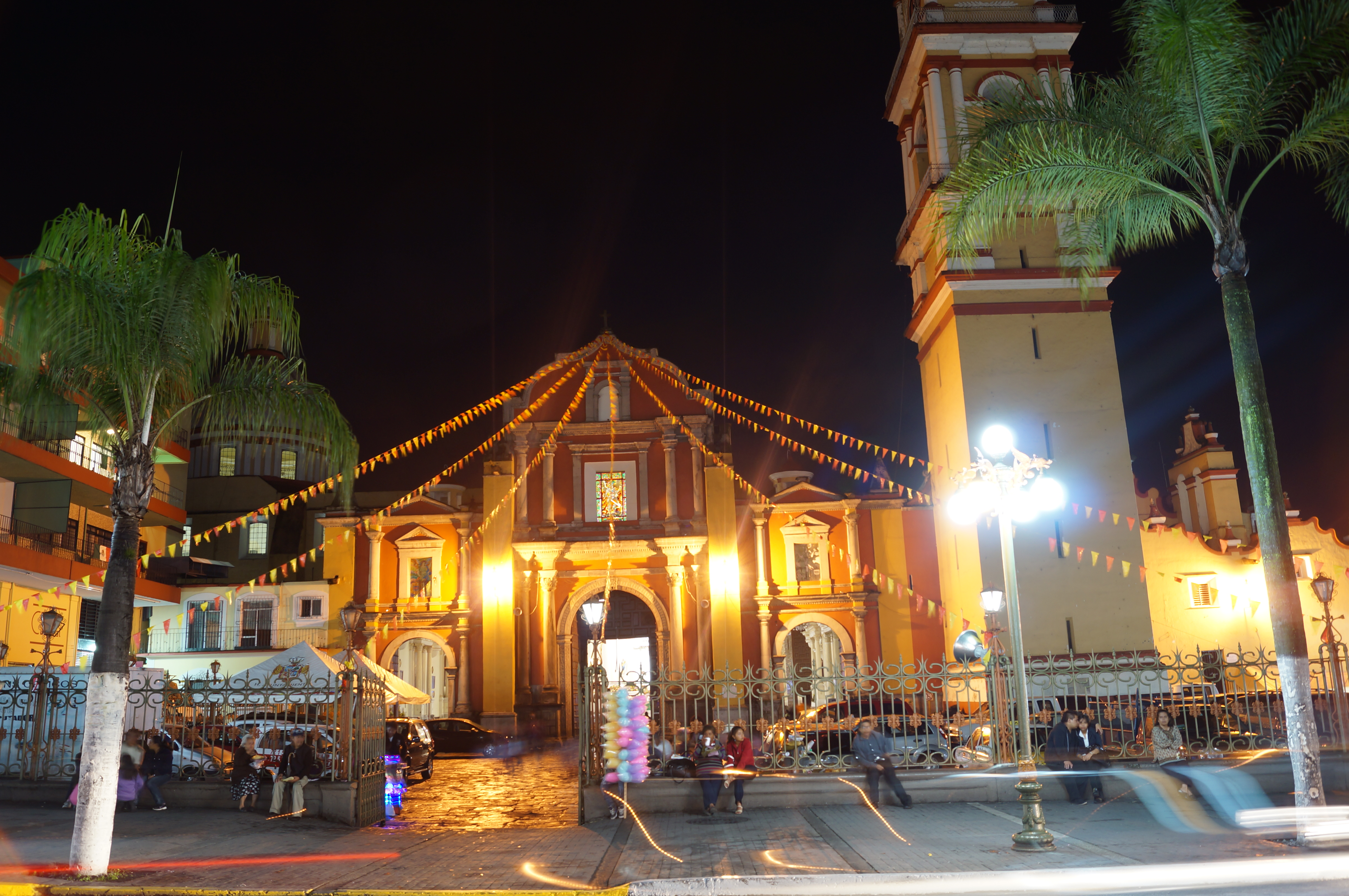
Another View
