= Virgin of Ocotlán =

Statue

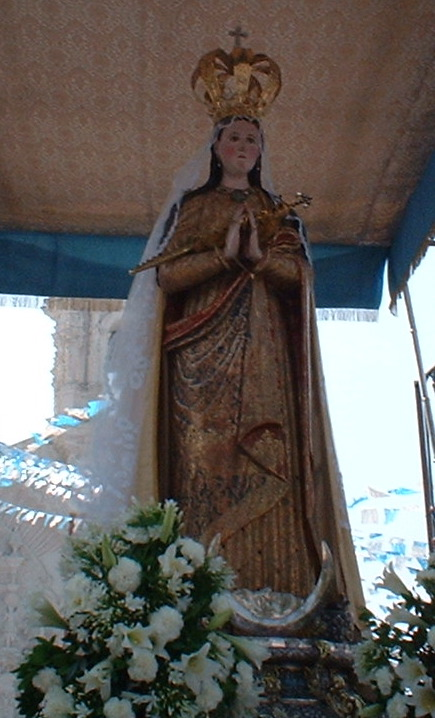
- Location: Ocotlán, Tlaxcala, Mexico
- Type: Marian statue
- Approval: Pope Pius X
- Patronage: Mexico (Tlaxcala and Pueblo)

The Virgin of Ocotlán is a statue of the Blessed Virgin Mary in Ocotlán, Tlaxcala, Mexico. The Virgin of Ocotlán is the patroness saint of Tlaxcala and the neighbouring state of Puebla.

She was granted a decree of canonical coronation by Pope Pius X on 18 January 1909 and was crowned via Archbishop Eulogio Gillow y Zavalza on 31 July 1909.

== Spring 1541 ==
In late spring of 1541, a young native Tlaxcalan man named Juan Diego (sometimes given as Juan Diego Bernardino) was going to draw water from a river believed at the time to have healing properties. Juan Diego was a convert to Catholicism who was known for his piety and was a topil (altar server) at the Franciscan monastery. There was an epidemic in the region and he wanted to bring the water home to his family, who were sick.

As he came to a hilltop, he encountered a beautiful lady who asked him, "God bless you, my son, where are you going?"

Juan Diego explained that he was going to bring medicinal water to the sick. The lady responded, "Follow me closely. I will give you another water with which you will extinguish the contagion and cure not only your family but all who drink of it, for my heart is always inclined toward the lowly and will not suffer to see such things without remedying them."

The woman led Juan Diego down the steep hill as night began to fall. At the bottom was a pine grove with a spring of water, that still exists today. The lady told Juan Diego that whoever drank the smallest drop would be restored to perfect health. She then told him that he would find an image of her in the pine grove where they were standing, a "true portrait of her perfections and clemencies, and that he should advise the Franciscan fathers to place it in the church of St. Lawrence" that stood on top of the hill.

Juan Diego took water from the spring and hastened off to cure the sick. Later he went to the Franciscan monastery to tell the friars of his experience. The friars observed the expression on Juan Diego's face as he told the story and believed him, possibly also because he was a regular altar server there.

That evening they followed him back to the pine grove. In the light of the sunset, the trees seemed to burn without being consumed. One tree was particularly fat, so they opened it up with a hatchet and found the statue of Mary as Juan Diego had said they would. They prepared a litter from tree branches and flowers and lifted the statue up onto their shoulders to carry it to the church of St. Lawrence.

== History of the Shrine ==
The earliest mention of the shrine is found in the writing of the Tlaxcalan historian Diego Muñoz Camargo, who makes reference to there being a Franciscan missionary centre in Tlaxcala in 1588 or 1589 called Santa María Ocotla. In an earlier book he refers to a nacimiento desta agua ("source of this water") where there is a cross in a group of forest trees that evokes great devotion.

Juan de Palafox y Mendoza, then Archbishop of Puebla, made a visit to the shrine in 1644, although he does not mention a statue. He wrote in his own account of the visit that he recited the rosary there and praised the religious devotion of the inhabitants of the town. The first mention of the statue occurs in 1689, in the frontispiece of a history of the city of Tlaxcala, published by Don Juan Benaventura Zapata y Mendoza.

Diego de Osoria de Escobar, Archbishop of Puebla in 1670, appointed Juan de Escobar as caretaker of the shrine. Juan de Escobar is responsible for constructing the shrine with its present floor plan, with the chancel, transept, and cupola. The second caretaker, Francisco Fernández, was in charge of the shrine from 1691-1716. He installed the retablo dedicated to the Virgin of Guadalupe.

The third caretaker, Manuel Loayzaga, was the man responsible for giving the shrine the appearance it has today. He put in the magnificent central retablo with the great silver niche in which the statue stands as well as the pulpit. The pièce de resistance however is the camarín, the eight-sided chapel behind the niche that is used as the Virgin's dressing room. It is decorated with "solomonic columns", paintings from the Life of the Virgin, portraits of Doctors of the Church who defended the Virgin Mary, and at the centre, the great round table on which the statue stands as it is being dressed.

Just as importantly, Loayzaga put the final, "official" version of the Ocotlán legend into print, publishing two editions of his book Historia de la milagrosíssima imagen de Nuestra Señora de Occotlán (sic) in 1747 and 1750.

== The Statue ==
The statue of the Virgin of Ocotlán is the centrepiece of the shrine. It stands 148 cm tall and is reportedly made of pine, although this is not certain. It is carved as wearing a long tunic and mantle. The tunic is gold, with red trim. The mantle was blue at one time, but the paint has faded, revealing more gold beneath it. The statue stands erect, looking straight ahead, hands folded in front of the chest. The carved hair is brown and a replica of the image in the Museo de la Memoria shows it to have seven plaits of hair in back.

Normally, the statue is dressed in a cape. of which it owns many, and a large crown that was given to the statue in 1975. It also has pierced ears, earrings, and many finger rings in addition to the scepter it carries. A silver crescent moon with a "man in the moon" face looking up at her has been put at the base of the image to confirm its identity as an Immaculate Conception.

Devotion to the Virgin of Ocotlán is concentrated around the various processions that take place several times during the year. The statue leaves its niche over the altar on three fixed dates: New Year's Day and the first and third Mondays in May. The Monday processions are referred to as the bajada (descent) and the subida (ascent) respectively.

The shrine of the Virgin of Ocotlán is now a parish church. It is located on a hill overlooking the city. From the zocalo go two blocks north on Independenia to Guridi y Alcocer. Turn right and when the road forks, take the left fork uphill to the church.

== Sources ==
- Loayzaga, Manuel (1750). Historia de la Milagrosíssima Imágen de Nra. Sra. de Occotlán, Que Se Venera Extramuros de la Ciudad de Tlaxcala ... Reimpressa, y añadida, etc. Mexico: Viuda de Joseoh Hogal.
- Martinez Baracs, Rodrigo. La secuencia Tlaxcalteca. Origenes del culto a Nuestra Senora de Ocotlan. Mexico City: INAH, 2000.
- Nava Rodriguez, Luis. Historia de Nuestra Senora de Ocotlan. 2nd edition. Tlaxcala: Editoria de periodicos "La Prensa" 1975.
- ---. Historia de Nuestra Senora de Ocotlan. Revised and expanded edition. Tlaxcala: Editoria de periodicos "La Prensa" 1983.
- Nutini, Hugo. G. "Syncretism and Acculturation: The Historical Development of the Cult of the Patron Saint in Tlaxcala, Mexico". Ethnology, 15 (1976), pp. 301–321
