= Diocese of Veracruz =

Latin Catholic jurisdiction in Mexico

Diocese of Veracruz Dioecesis Verae Crucis Diócesis de Veracruz
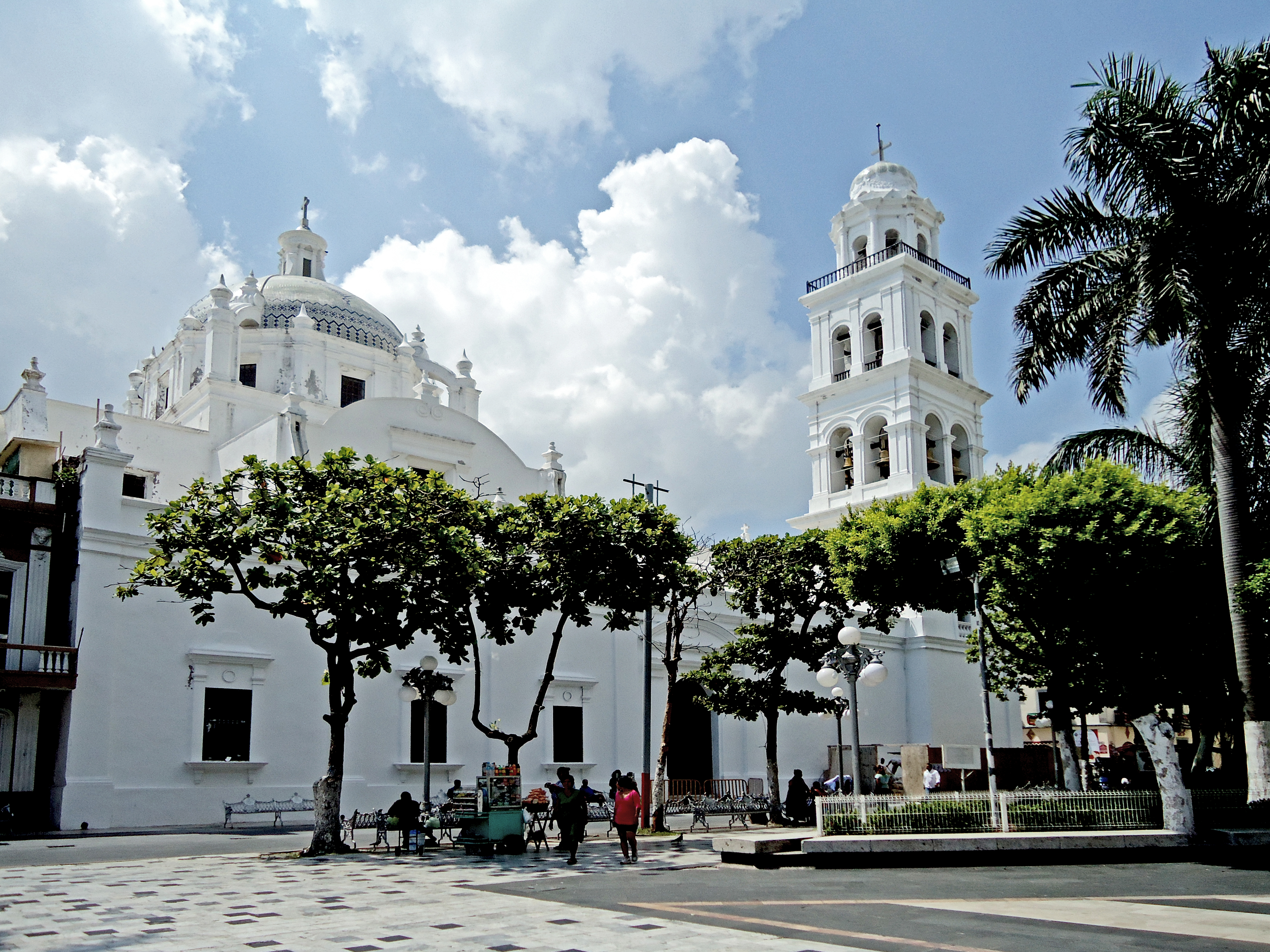
- Catedral de la Asunción de María

Location
- Country: Mexico
- Ecclesiastical province: Province of Jalapa

Statistics
- Area: 3,476 sq mi (9,000 km^{2})
- Population: Total; Catholics: (as of 2010); 2,105,000; 1,894,000 (90%)
- Parishes: 72

Information
- Denomination: Catholic Church
- Sui iuris church: Latin Church
- Rite: Roman Rite
- Established: 9 June 1962 (63 years ago)
- Cathedral: Cathedral of the Assumption of Mary

Current leadership
- Pope: Leo XIV
- Bishop: Carlos Briseño Arch, O.A.R.
- Metropolitan Archbishop: Jorge Carlos Patrón Wong
- Bishops emeritus: Luis Felipe Gallardo Martín del Campo, S.D.B.

Website
- diocesisdeveracruz.mx

The Diocese of Veracruz (Latin: Dioecesis Verae Crucis) is a Latin Church ecclesiastical territory of diocese of the Catholic Church in Mexico. It was erected 9 June 1962. The diocese is a suffragan in the ecclesiastical province of the metropolitan Archdiocese of Xalapa (that was founded in 1844 as "Diocese of Veracruz").

== Bishops ==
=== Ordinaries ===
- José Guadalupe Padilla Lozano (1963–2000)
- Luis Gabriel Cuara Méndez (2000–2005)
- Luis Felipe Gallardo Martín del Campo, S.D.B. (2006-2018)
- Carlos Briseño Arch, O.A.R. (2018- )

=== Other priest of this diocese who became bishop ===
- Rutilo Muñoz Zamora, appointed Bishop of Coatzacoalcos, Veracruz in 2002

== Episcopal See ==
- Veracruz, Veracruz

== External links and references ==
- "Diocese of Veracruz". Catholic-Hierarchy.
