= José Hiraís Acosta Beltrán =

Mexican Roman Catholic bishop

Most Reverend José Hiraís Acosta Beltrán
- Bishop of Huejutla
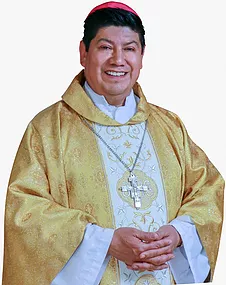
- Archdiocese: Tulancingo
- Diocese: Huejutla
- Appointed: 28 January 2016
- Predecessor: Salvador Rangel Mendoza, O.F.M.
- Successor: Incumbent
- Previous posts: Prefect of studies and spiritual director of the Major Seminary of Huejutla, defender of the diocesan bond and member of the College of Consultants of the Roman Catholic Diocese of Huejutla

Orders
- Ordination: 11 June 1993 by Bishop Juan de Dios Caballero Reyes
- Consecration: 14 March 2016 by Christophe Pierre, Juan de Dios Caballero Reyes, Salvador Rangel Mendoza

Personal details
- Born: 22 September 1966 (age 60) Pezmatlán, Hidalgo, Mexico
- Denomination: Roman Catholic
- Education: Universidad Pontificia de México
- Motto: AQUÍ ESTOY, SEÑOR ENVÍAME "HERE I AM, LORD SEND ME"
- Coat of arms

Bishop José Hiraís Acosta Beltrán is the current serving bishop of the Roman Catholic Diocese of Huejutla.

== Early life and education ==
Acosta Beltrán was born in Pezmatlán, Hidalgo, Mexico, on 22 September 1966. He completed his ecclesiastical studies from the Regional Seminary of Our Lady of Guadalupe in Tula. He also acquired a degree in philosophy from the Pontifical University of Mexico.

== Priesthood ==
Acosta Beltrán was ordained a deacon on 25 November 1992 by Bishop Juan de Dios Caballero Reyes and a priest on 11 June 1993. He has served as parochial vicar, vice rector of the Minor Seminary, professor and formator of the Major Seminary and judge of the Ecclesiastical Court of Huejutla.

Before being appointed as a bishop, he served as prefect of studies and spiritual director of the Major Seminary of Huejutla, defender of the diocesan bond and member of the College of Consultants of the Roman Catholic Diocese of Huejutla.

== Episcopate ==
On 28 January 2016, Pope Francis appointed José Hiraís Acosta Beltrán as bishop of the Roman Catholic Diocese of Huejutla. Consecration was done by Christophe Pierre on 14 March 2016.
