= Francisco de Paula Suárez Peredo y Bezares =

Francisco de Paula Suárez Peredo y Bezares (born 1823 in Puebla, Puebla) was a Mexican clergyman and bishop for the Roman Catholic Archdiocese of Xalapa. He was ordained in 1848. He was appointed bishop in 1863. He died in 1870.
