= Hipólito Reyes Larios =

Mexican bishop (1946–2021)

- Archbishop of Xalapa
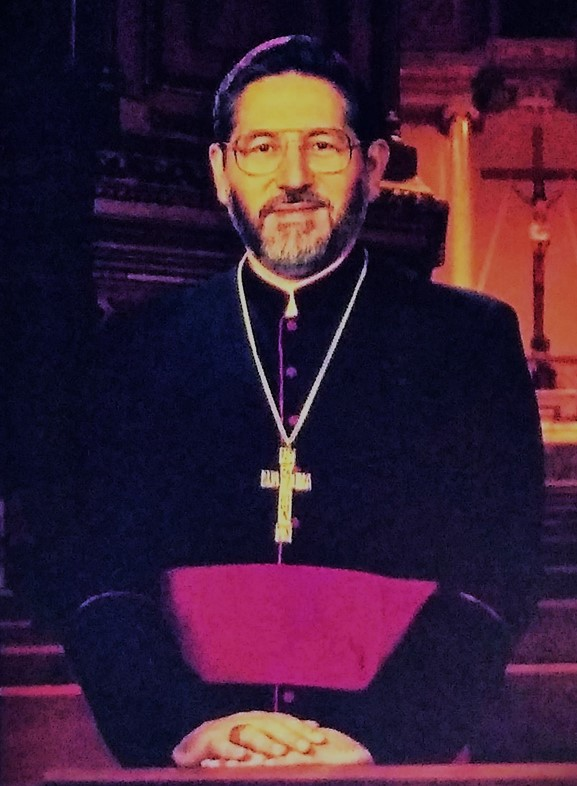
- Church: Catholic Church
- Archdiocese: Archdiocese of Xalapa
- In office: 10 April 2007 – 8 August 2021
- Predecessor: Sergio Obeso Rivera
- Successor: Jorge Carlos Patrón Wong
- Previous post: Bishop of Orizaba (2000-2007)

Orders
- Ordination: 15 August 1973
- Consecration: 13 June 2000 by Sergio Obeso Rivera

Personal details
- Born: 13 August 1946 Ciudad Mendoza (southwest of Nogales), Veracruz, Mexico
- Died: 8 August 2021 (aged 74) Xalapa, Veracruz, Mexico

Hipólito Reyes Larios (13 August 1946 – 8 August 2021) was a Mexican Roman Catholic prelate. Reyes served as the first Bishop of the Roman Catholic Diocese of Orizaba in Veracruz from 2000 until 2007. He was then appointed Archbishop of the Roman Catholic Archdiocese of Xalapa, based in the capital city of Veracruz, from 2007 until his death on 8 August 2021.

Reyes Larios was born in the city of Ciudad Mendoza, Veracruz, on 13 August 1946, to Melitón Reyes Andrade and Dolores Larios Pastrana. He completed his studies at Seminario Regional de Xalapa. Reyes Larios then completed degrees in ascetical theology at the Pontifical Gregorian University and moral theology from the Alphonsian Academy in Rome. He was ordained a Catholic priest on 15 August 1973.

Pope John Paul II appointed Reyes as the first bishop of the newly created Roman Catholic Diocese of Orizaba on 15 April 2000. The bishop was formally ordained on 13 June 2000. He was elevated to Archbishop of the Roman Catholic Archdiocese of Xalapa by Pope Benedict XVI in 2007, a position he held until his death in 2021.

Archbishop Hipólito Reyes Larios died from an internal hemorrhage at a hospital in Xalapa on 8 August 2021, at the age of 74. He died days before his 75th birthday, the mandatory retirement age for Catholic bishops and archbishops.
