= Diocese of Tuxpan =

Latin Catholic jurisdiction in Mexico

Diocese of Tuxpan Dioecesis Tuxpaniensis Diócesis de Tuxpan

Location
- Country: Mexico
- Ecclesiastical province: Province of Xalapa

Statistics
- Area: 7,338 sq mi (19,010 km^{2})
- Population: Total; Catholics: (as of 2010); 2,055,000; 1,250,000 (60.8%)
- Parishes: 59

Information
- Denomination: Catholic Church
- Sui iuris church: Latin Church
- Rite: Roman Rite
- Established: 9 June 1962 (63 years ago)
- Cathedral: Cathedral of Our Lady of the Assumption

Current leadership
- Pope: Leo XIV
- Bishop: Roberto Madrigal Gallegos
- Metropolitan Archbishop: Hipólito Reyes Larios

The Diocese of Tuxpan (Latin: Dioecesis Tuxpaniensis) It was erected 9 June 1962. The diocese is a suffragan in the ecclesiastical province of the metropolitan Archdiocese of Xalapa.

== Bishops ==
=== Ordinaries ===
- Ignacio Lehonor Arroyo (1963-1982)
- Mario de Gasperín Gasperín (1983-1989), appointed Bishop of Querétaro
- Luis Gabriel Cuara Méndez (1989-2000), appointed Bishop of Veracruz
- Domingo Díaz Martínez (2002-2008), appointed Archbishop of Tulancingo, Hidalgo
- Juan Navarro Castellanos (2009-2021)
- Roberto Madrigal Gallegos (2021-)

=== Other priest of this diocese who became bishop ===
- Francisco Eduardo Cervantes Merino, appointed Bishop of Orizaba, Veracruz in 2015

== Episcopal See ==
- Tuxpan, Veracruz

== External links and references ==
- "Diocese of Tuxpan". Catholic-Hierarchy.
