= Diocese of Coatzacoalcos =

Roman Catholic diocese in Mexico

Coordinates: 18.1462°N 94.4160°W

Diocese of Coatzacoalcos Dioecesis Coatzacoalsensis Diócesis de Coatzacoalcos
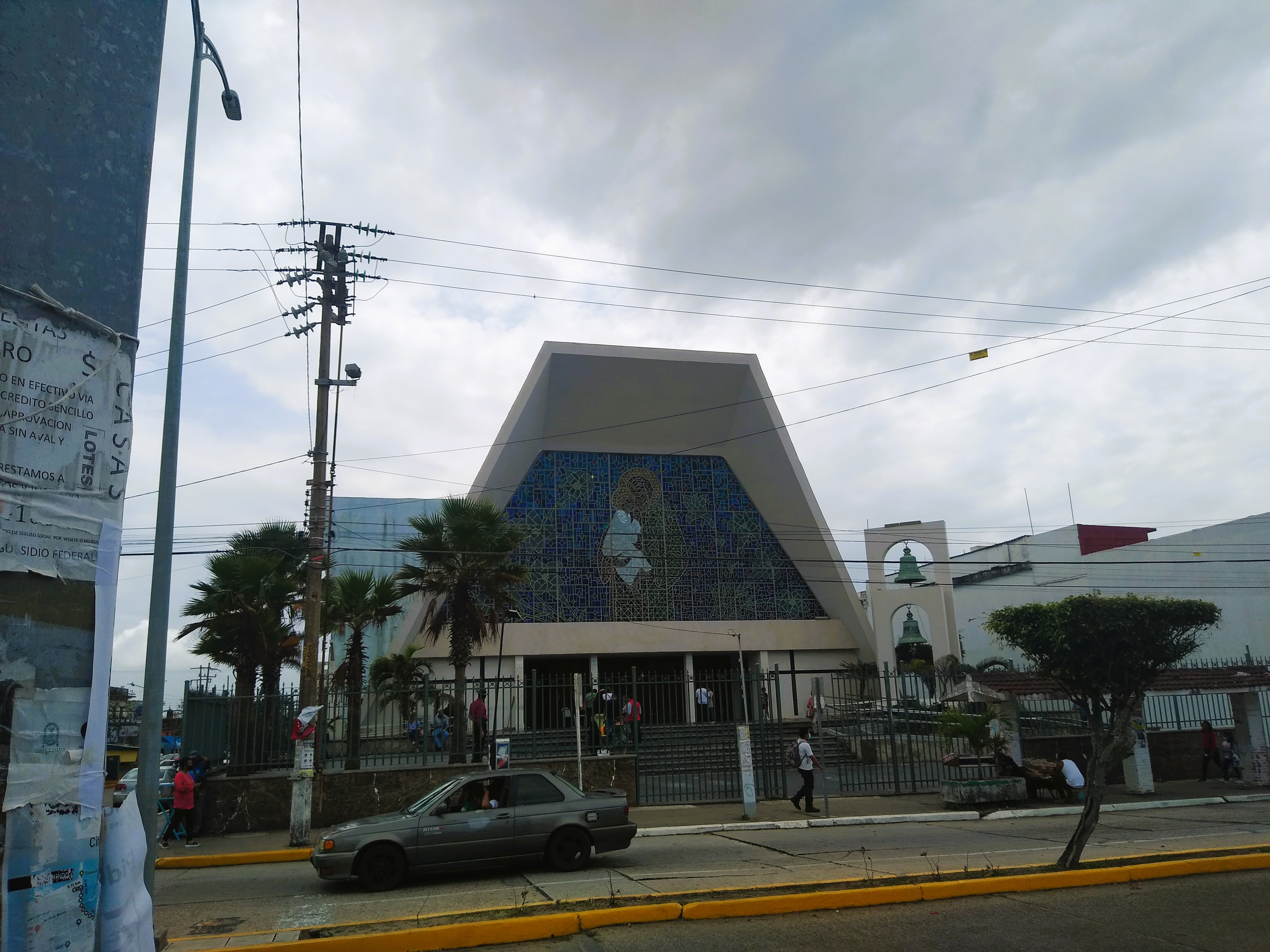

Location
- Country: Mexico
- Ecclesiastical province: Province of Jalapa
- Metropolitan: Coatzacoalcos

Statistics
- Area: 4,055 sq mi (10,500 km^{2})
- Population: Total; Catholics: (as of 2006); 988,553; 795.419 (80.5%)
- Parishes: 25

Information
- Denomination: Roman Catholic
- Rite: Roman Rite
- Established: 14 March 1984 (42 years ago)
- Cathedral: Cathedral of St. Joseph

Current leadership
- Pope: Leo XIV
- Bishop: Rutilo Muñoz Zamora
- Metropolitan Archbishop: Vacant

Website
- www.diocesiscoatza.org

The Roman Catholic Diocese of Coatzacoalcos (Latin: Dioecesis Coatzacoalsensis) (erected 14 March 1984) is a suffragan diocese of the Archdiocese of Jalapa.

== Ordinaries ==
- Carlos Talavera Ramírez (1984 -2002)
- Rutilo Muñoz Zamora (2002 - )

== Episcopal See ==
- Coatzacoalcos, Veracruz

== External links and references ==
- "Diocese of Coatzacoalcos". Catholic-Hierarchy.
