= José María Mora y Daza =

Mexican bishop (1820–1887)

José María Mora y Daza (born 1820 in Xalapa) was a Mexican clergyman and bishop for the Roman Catholic Archdiocese of Xalapa. He was ordained in 1851. He was appointed bishop in 1870. He subsequently became bishop of Tlaxcala. He died in 1887.
