= Ernesto Corripio y Ahumada =

His Eminence Ernesto Corripio y Ahumada
- Cardinal, Primate Archbishop of Mexico
- Diocese: Mexico
- See: Mexico
- Appointed: 19 July 1977
- Term ended: 29 September 1994
- Predecessor: Miguel Darío Miranda y Gómez
- Successor: Norberto Rivera Carrera
- Previous posts: Bishop of Tampico (1956–1967); Archbishop of Antequera (1967–1977); Archbishop of Puebla de los Ángeles (1977–1994)

Orders
- Ordination: 15 October 1942 by Pope Pius XII
- Consecration: 19 March 1953 by Octaviano Márquez y Toriz
- Created cardinal: 30 June 1979 by Pope John Paul II
- Rank: Cardinal-Priest

Personal details
- Born: June 29, 1919 Tampico, Tamaulipas, Mexico
- Died: 10 April 2008 (aged 88) La Noria, Xochimilco, Mexico
- Denomination: Roman Catholic
- Education: Pontifical Gregorian University
- Motto: Nuestro Vivir es Cristo
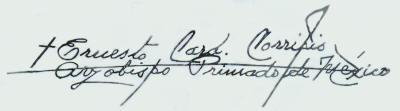
- Signature

- Coat of arms

Styles of Ernesto Corripio Ahumada
- Reference style: His Eminence
- Spoken style: Your Eminence
- Informal style: Cardinal
- See: Mexico City (emeritus)

Ernesto Corripio y Ahumada (June 29, 1919 – April 10, 2008) was a Mexican Catholic prelate who served as Archbishop of Mexico and Primate of Mexico(1977–1994). He was made a cardinal in 1979.

== Life ==
Corripio y Ahumada was ordained to the priesthood on October 15, 1942. He served as a diocesan priest in his hometown of Tampico for ten years. On December 27, 1952, Pope Pius XII appointed him auxiliary bishop of the Diocese of Tampico. On March 19, 1953, he was consecrated titular bishop of Zapara. On February 25, 1956, he became Bishop of the diocese.

Pope Paul VI elevated Corripio y Ahumada on July 25, 1967, to Archbishop of Antequera in the state of Oaxaca. On March 11, 1976, he was transferred to become Archbishop of the Archdiocese of Puebla de los Angeles in the state of Puebla. The Pope transferred Corripio y Ahumada once again on July 19, 1977, to the post of Archbishop of Mexico.

Upon assuming the papal throne, Pope John Paul II appointed Corripio y Ahumada a member of the College of Cardinals. In the consistory of June 30, 1979, in Vatican City Pope John Paul II created him Cardinal Priest of the titular church of Mary Immaculate of Tiburtino. He was a member of various departments of the Roman Curia while serving his archdiocese.

He retired on September 29, 1994, and lost the right to participate in a conclave when he reached 80 in 1999.

He died on April 10, 2008, in his house in La Noria, Xochimilco in Mexico City, after complications related to deep thrombosis in his left arm. He is buried in the crypt of Mexico City Metropolitan Cathedral.

Catholic Church titles
Preceded by Serafín María Armora y González	Bishop of Tampico; 1956–1967	Succeeded by Arturo Antonio Szymanski Ramírez
Preceded by Fortino Gómez León	Archbishop of Antequera; 1967–1976	Succeeded by Bartolomé Carrasco Briseño
Preceded by Octaviano Márquez y Tóriz	Archbishop of Puebla de los Ángeles; 1976–1977	Succeeded by Rosendo Huesca Pacheco
Preceded by Miguel Darío Miranda y Gómez	Archbishop of Mexico; 1977–1994	Succeeded by Norberto Rivera Carrera
