= Arturo Antonio Szymanski Ramírez =

Mexican Roman Catholic prelate (1922–2018)

- Archbishop of Archdiocese of San Luis Potosí Emeritus
- Church: Roman Catholic Church
- See: Archdiocese of San Luis Potosí
- In office: 1987–1999
- Predecessor: Ezequiel Perea Sánchez
- Successor: Luis Morales Reyes

Orders
- Ordination: 22 March 1947
- Consecration: 21 June 1960 by Ernesto Corripio y Ahumada

Personal details
- Born: 17 January 1922; Tampico, Tamaulipas, Mexico
- Died: 29 May 2018 (aged 96); San Luis Potosí, Mexico

Arturo Antonio Szymanski Ramírez (17 January 1922 – 29 May 2018) was a Mexican prelate of the Roman Catholic Church.

Szymanski was born in Tampico and ordained a priest on 22 March 1947. Szymanski was appointed Coadjutor Bishop of the Diocese of San Andrés Tuxtla as well as titular bishop of Cerasus on 20 April 1960 and was consecrated on 21 June 1960. Symanski succeeded bishop Jesús Villareal y Fierro a short time after his death on 21 March 1965 to the Diocese of San Andrés Tuxtla. On 13 August 1968 Szymanski was appointed bishop of the Diocese of Tampico and would remain at the Tampico diocese until 1987. Szymanski was appointed archbishop of the Archdiocese of San Luis Potosí on 27 January 1987 where he would remain until his retirement on 20 January 1999.
