= Rosendo Huesca Pacheco =

Mexican Roman Catholic prelate

- Archbishop of Puebla de los Ángeles
- Church: Catholic Church
- Archdiocese: Archdiocese of Puebla de los Ángeles
- In office: 28 September 1977 – 5 February 2009
- Predecessor: Ernesto Corripio y Ahumada
- Successor: Víctor Sánchez Espinosa
- Previous posts: Titular Bishop of Themisonium (1970-1977); Auxiliary Bishop of Puebla de los Ángeles (1970-1977)

Orders
- Ordination: 28 October 1956 by Luigi Traglia
- Consecration: 24 August 1970 by Octaviano Márquez y Toriz

Personal details
- Born: 3 March 1932 Ejutla de Crespo, Oaxaca, Mexico
- Died: 25 November 2017 (aged 85)

Rosendo Huesca Pacheco (3 March 1932 – 25 November 2017) was a Mexican Catholic prelate. Born in 1932, he was ordained a priest in 1956. In 1970, he was consecrated bishop. He became Archbishop of Puebla de los Ángeles in 1977 and served until his retirement in 2009. Huesca Pacheco died at the age of 85 on 25 November 2017.

== External links and additional sources ==
- Cheney, David M. "Archdiocese of Puebla de los Ángeles, Puebla". Catholic-Hierarchy.org. (for Chronology of Bishops)^{self-published}
- Chow, Gabriel. "Metropolitan Archdiocese of Puebla de los Ángeles". GCatholic.org. (for Chronology of Bishops)^{self-published}
