= Archdiocese of Xalapa =

Latin Catholic jurisdiction in Mexico

Coordinates: 19.5400°N 96.9275°W

Archdiocese of Xalapa Archidioecesis Ialapensis Arquidiócesis de Xalapa
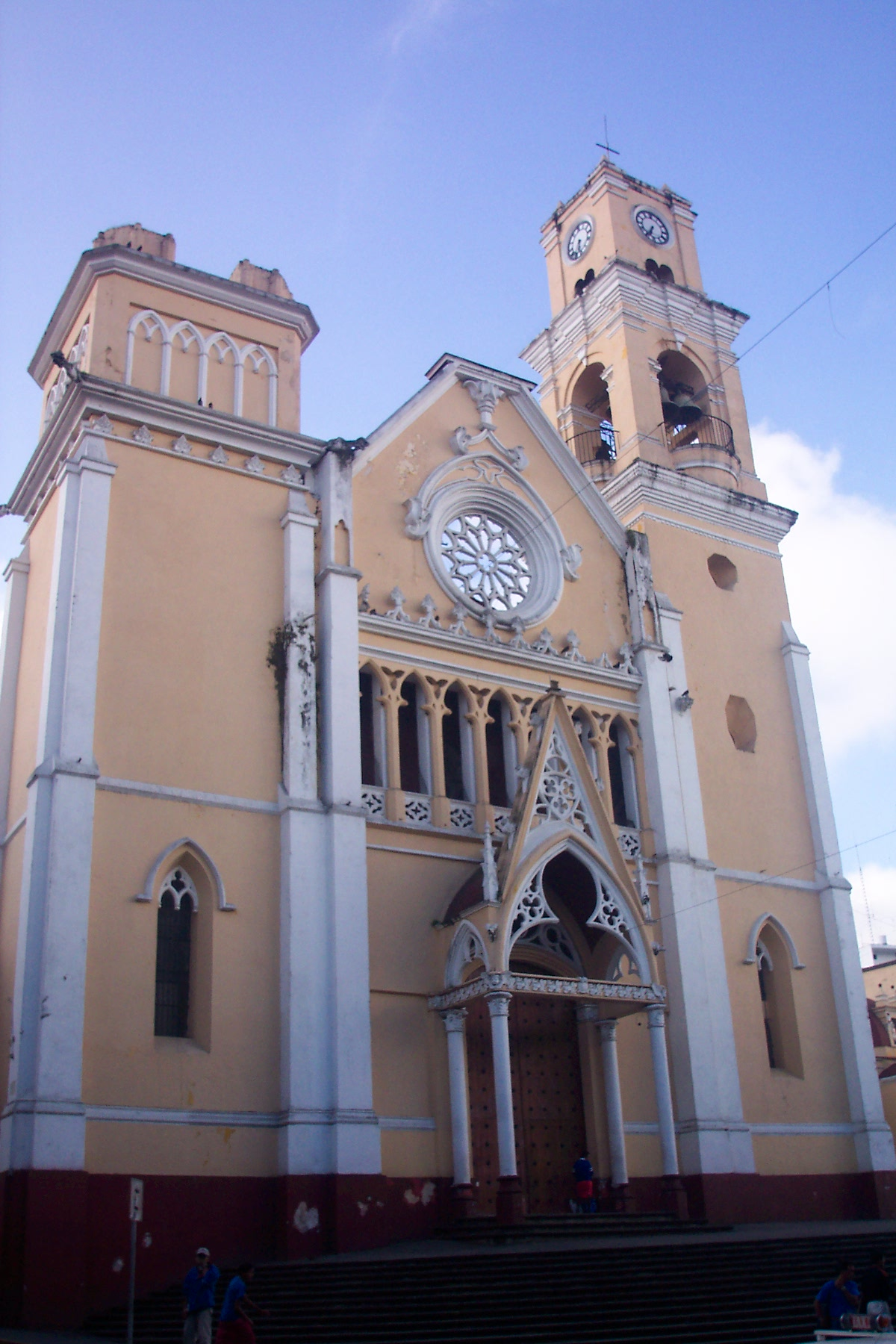
- Catedral Metropolitana de la Immaculada Concepción

Location
- Country: Mexico
- Ecclesiastical province: Province of Xalapa

Statistics
- Area: 2,370 sq mi (6,100 km^{2})
- Population: Total; Catholics: (as of 2006); 1,156,000; 1,105,000 (95.6%)
- Parishes: 71

Information
- Denomination: Catholic Church
- Sui iuris church: Latin Church
- Rite: Roman Rite
- Established: 19 March 1863 (162 years ago)
- Cathedral: Cathedral of the Immaculate Conception

Current leadership
- Pope: Leo XIV
- Metropolitan Archbishop: Jorge Carlos Patrón Wong
- Auxiliary Bishops: José Rafael Palma Capetillo

Map

Website
- www.arquidiocesisdexalapa.com

The Archdiocese of Xalapa (Latin: Archidioecesis Ialapensis) is a Latin Church ecclesiastical territory or archdiocese of the Catholic Church in Mexico. Its episcopal see is Xalapa, Veracruz. A metropolitan see, its ecclesiastical province includes the suffragan dioceses of Coatzacoalcos, Córdoba, Orizaba, Papantla, San Andrés Tuxtla, Tuxpan and Veracruz.

== Bishops ==
=== Ordinaries ===
- Francisco de Paula Suárez Peredo y Bezares (1863–1869)
- José María Mora y Daza (1870–1884); appointed Bishop of Tlaxcala (Puebla de los Angeles)
- José Ignacio Suárez Peredo y Bezares (1887–1894)
- Joaquín Acadio Pagaza y Ordóñez (1895–1919)
- St. Rafael Guízar Valencia (1919–1938)
- Manuel Pío López Estrada (1939–1968)
- Emilio Abascal y Salmerón (1968–1979)
- Sergio Obeso Rivera (1979–2007); elevated to Cardinal in 2018
- Hipólito Reyes Larios (2007–2021); died in office
- Jorge Carlos Patrón Wong (2021–present)

=== Coadjutor bishop ===
- Sergio Obeso Rivera (1974–1979); future Cardinal

=== Auxiliary bishop ===
- José Rafael Palma Capetillo (2016–present)

=== Other priest of this diocese who became bishop ===
- Ignacio Lehonor Arroyo, appointed Bishop of Tuxpan, Veracruz in 1963
- Sergio Cardinal Obeso Rivera, appointed Bishop of Papantla, Puebla, México in 1971; future Cardinal

== History ==
- 19 March 1863: Erected as Diocese of Veracruz-Jalapa (from Antequera-Oaxaca and Tlaxcala) even if the bull of erection is of 1844.
- 24 November 1922: Territory lost to Papantla.
- 29 June 1951: Elevated as Archdiocese of Veracruz-Jalapa.
- 23 May 1959: Territory lost to San Andrés Tuxtla.
- 9 June 1962: Archdiocese of Jalapa erected; territory lost to Veracruz.
- 15 April 2000: Territory lost to Córdoba.
- 15 April 2000: Territory lost to Orizaba.

== See also ==
- Xalapa Cathedral
- List of Roman Catholic archdioceses in México
