= Luis Munive Escobar =

Mexican Roman Catholic bishop

- Bishop of Tlaxcala
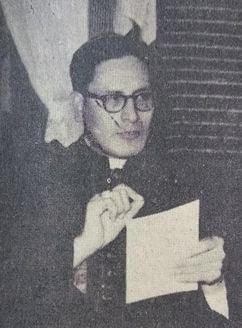
- Church: Catholic Church
- Diocese: Diocese of Tlaxcala
- In office: 13 June 1959 – 10 February 2001
- Predecessor: Diocese erected
- Successor: Jacinto Guerrero Torres

Orders
- Ordination: 25 March 1944 by Lucio Torreblanca y Tapia
- Consecration: 12 November 1959 by Octaviano Márquez y Toriz

Personal details
- Born: 21 June 1920 Chiautempan, Tlaxcala, Mexico
- Died: 25 May 2001 (aged 80)

Luis Munive Escobar (21 June 1920 − 25 May 2001) was a Mexican Roman Catholic bishop. Ordained to the priesthood on 25 March 1944, Munive Escobar was named bishop of the Roman Catholic Diocese of Tlaxcala, Mexico in 1959 and retired in 2001.
