= Joaquín Acadio Pagaza y Ordóñez =

Mexican ecclesiastic, writer and translator

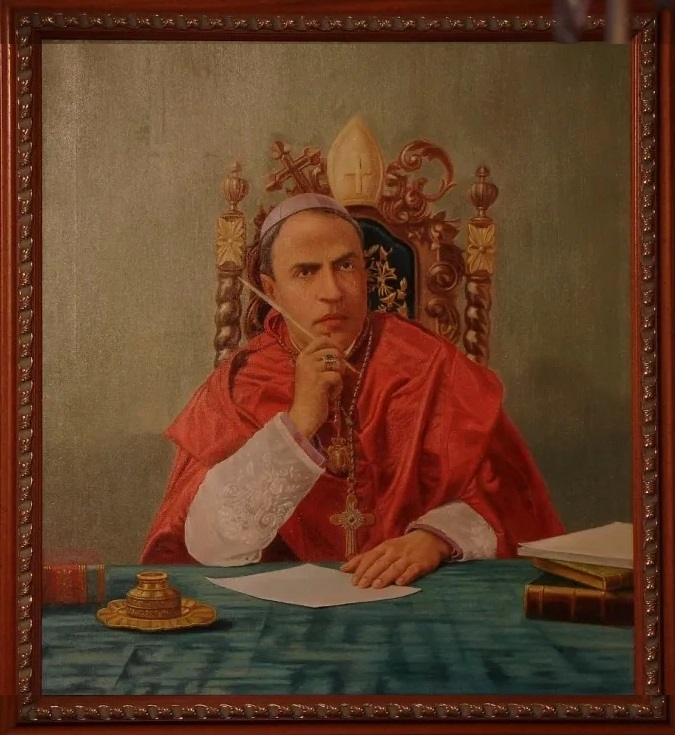
An episcopal portrait from the Museo Joaquín Arcadio Pagaza

Joaquín Arcadio Pagaza y Ordóñez was a Mexican ecclesiastic, writer and translator, born 6 January, 1839 in Valle de Bravo, died 15 July 1918 in Xalapa.

== Life and work ==
Pagaza was ordained in 1864 and served in various capacities until he was made bishop of Veracruz in 1895, an appointment he held until his death in 1918. He had written poetry since the start of his studies and was nominated to the Mexican Academy of Letters in 1882. He was noted for his versions of Virgil and Horace, as well as for his three collections of original poems: Murmurios de la selva (Jungle rustling, 1887); María (fragments of a descriptive poem of the torrid zone, 1890); Algunas trovas últimas (Last verses, 1893). His sonnets especially celebrate the distinctive tropical landscape of Veracruz.

On the centenary of Pagaza's birth, a bronze plaque was placed on his birthplace honouring him as cleric, poet and translator and a museum dedicated to him was opened in 1964.

== See also ==
- 2 poems translated by Alice Stone Blackwell from a 1920 anthology
- 2 poems translated by Samuel Beckett in Anthology of Mexican Poetry, Indiana University Press (1958), pp. 104-5
