= Jorge Carlos Patrón Wong =

Mexican archbishop (born 1958)

The Most Reverend Jorge Carlos Patrón Wong
- Archbishop of Xalapa
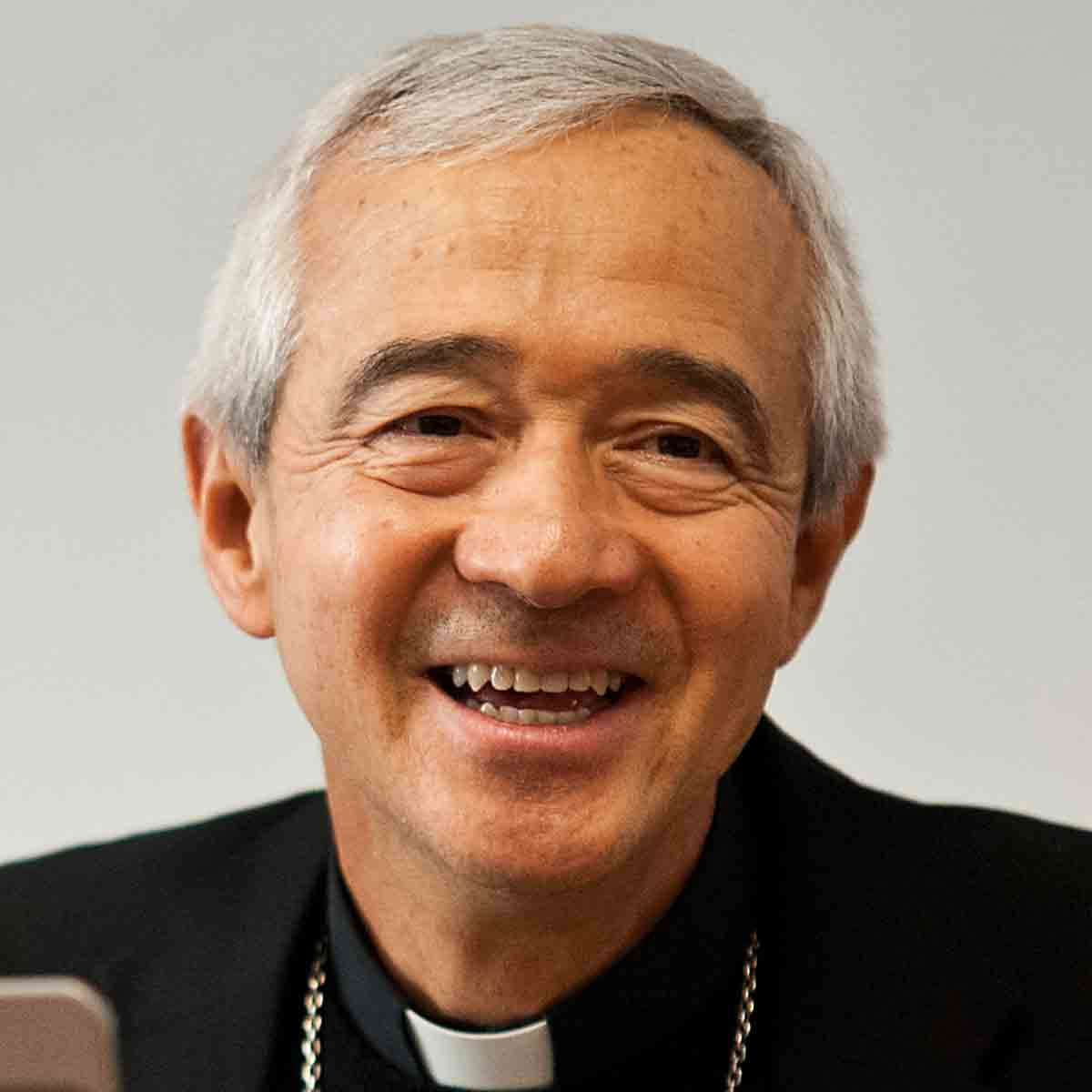
- Church: Roman Catholic Church
- Appointed: 8 December 2021
- Predecessor: Hipólito Reyes Larios
- Previous posts: Coadjutor Bishop of Papantla (2009–12); Bishop of Papantla (2012–13)

Orders
- Ordination: 12 January 1988 by Manuel Castro Ruiz
- Consecration: 15 December 2009 by Christophe Pierre, Emilio Carlos Berlie, Hipólito Reyes Larios

Personal details
- Born: Jorge Carlos Patrón Wong; 3 January 1958 (age 68) Mérida, Yucatán, Mexico
- Education: Pontifical Gregorian University
- Motto: Fiat voluntas tua
- Coat of arms

Jorge Carlos Patrón Wong (born 3 January 1958) is a Mexican archbishop who worked in the Roman Curia as Secretary for Seminaries of the Congregation for the Clergy from 2013 to 2021, when he was appointed Archbishop of Xalapa. He has been a bishop since 2009.

== Biography ==
Jorge Carlos Patrón Wong was born in Mérida, Yucatán, on 3 January 1958. His maternal grandfather had emigrated to Mexico from China. He was ordained a priest by Manuel Castro Ruiz on 12 January 1988 for the Archdiocese of Yucatán. On 15 October 2009 he was appointed the coadjutor bishop of Papantla, and he was ordained a bishop on 15 December of that year by Archbishop Christophe Pierre, Apostolic Nuncio to Mexico. He succeeded Lorenzo Cárdenas Aregullín as bishop of the diocese on 2 May 2012.

Pope Francis appointed him secretary of the Congregation for the Clergy on 21 September 2013 and made him a titular archbishop. He joked that his "Chinese features and Chinese blood" eased his communication with Asians in Rome. On 9 November 2013 he was made a member of the Congregation for Catholic Education, on 29 July 2014 a consultor of the Congregation for the Evangelization of Peoples, and on 15 September 2015 a councilor of the Pontifical Commission for Latin America.

On 8 December 2021, Pope Francis named him Archbishop of Xalapa.
