= Basilica of Our Lady of Guadalupe =

Church in Mexico City

- Basílica de Nuestra Señora de Guadalupe
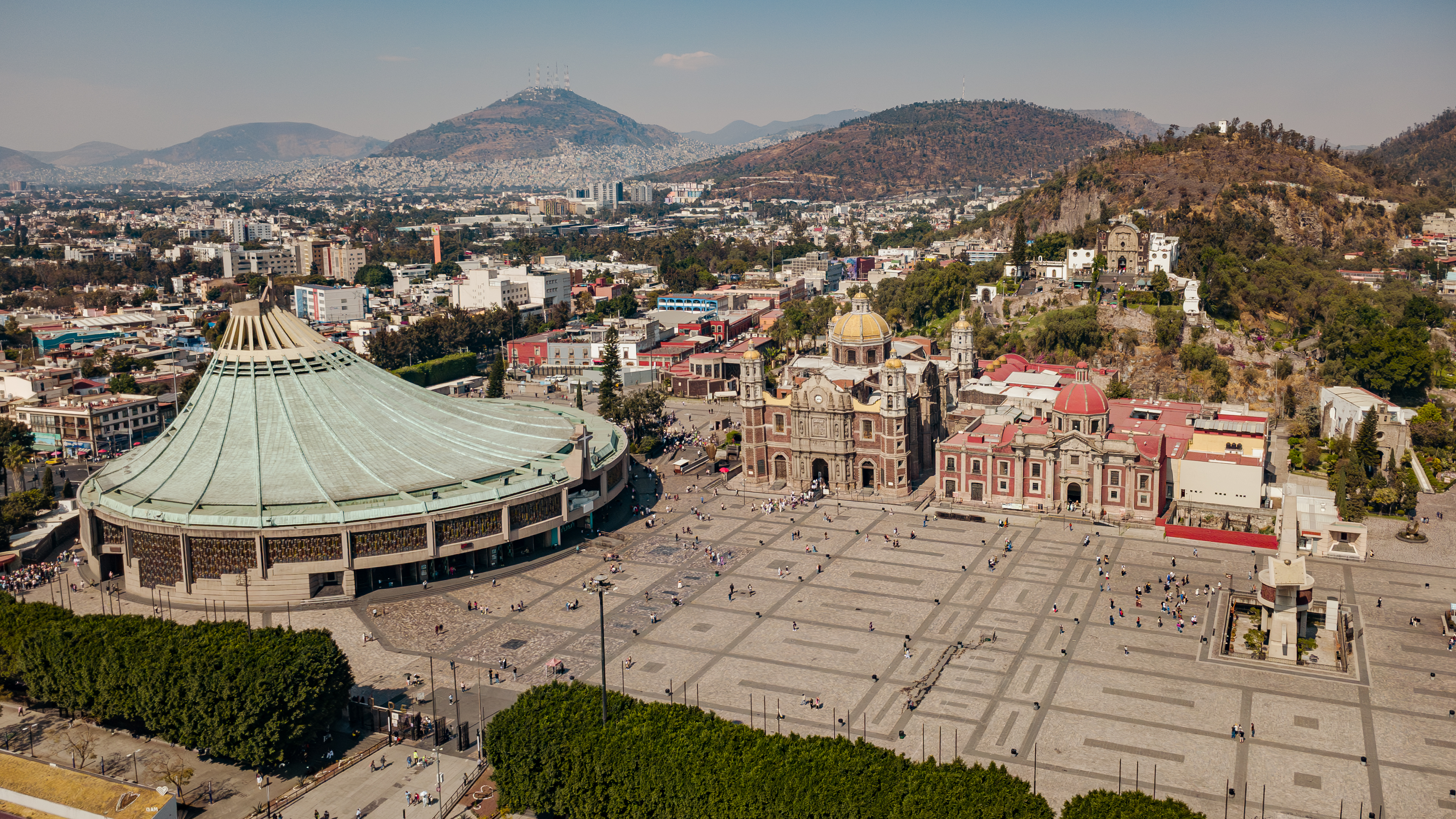
- Basilica of Our Lady of Guadalupe
- 19°29′2.4″N 99°7′1.2″W
- Location: Villa de Guadalupe, Mexico City
- Country: Mexico
- Language: Spanish
- Denomination: Catholic Church
- Sui iuris church: Latin Church
- Website: www.virgendeguadalupe.org.mx

History
- Status: Minor Basilica; National shrine
- Founded: 1709; 317 years ago
- Dedication: Our Lady of Guadalupe
- Consecrated: October 12, 1976; 50 years ago

Architecture
- Functional status: Active
- Architect(s): José Luis Benlliure Galán,Pedro Ramírez Vázquez, Alejandro Schoenhofer, Friar Gabriel Chávez de la Mora, Antonio S. Gómez Palacio, Javier García Lascuráin
- Architectural type: Basilica
- Style: Mexican Baroque

Specifications
- Capacity: 10,000 (seating)
- Height: 42 m (138 ft)

Administration
- Province: Mexico
- Metropolis: Mexico
- Archdiocese: Mexico
- Deanery: Guadalupana
- Parish: Our Lady of Guadalupe

Clergy
- Rector: Enrique Glennie Graue

The Basilica of Santa María de Guadalupe, officially called Insigne y Nacional Basílica de Santa María de Guadalupe (in English: Basilica of Our Lady of Guadalupe) is a basilica of the Catholic Church, dedicated to the Virgin Mary in her invocation of Our Lady of Guadalupe, located at the foot of the Hill of Tepeyac in the Gustavo A. Madero borough of Mexico City. It belongs to the Primate Archdiocese of Mexico through the Guadalupana Vicariate, which since November 4, 2018, is in the care of Monsignor Efraín Hernández Díaz, who has the title of general and episcopal vicar of Guadalupe and abbot of the basilica.

Every year some twenty million pilgrims visit the sanctuary, of which about nine million do so in the days around December 12, the day on which Our Lady of Guadalupe is celebrated. Annually, the Basilica of Santa María de Guadalupe has at least twice as many visitors as the best-known Marian shrines.

== History ==
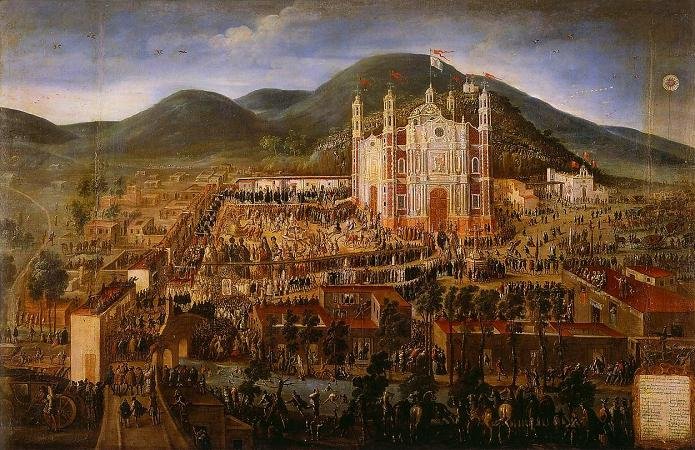
Transfer of the image of the Virgin of Guadalupe and dedication of the sanctuary, Mexico City, 1709, by Manuel de Arellano.

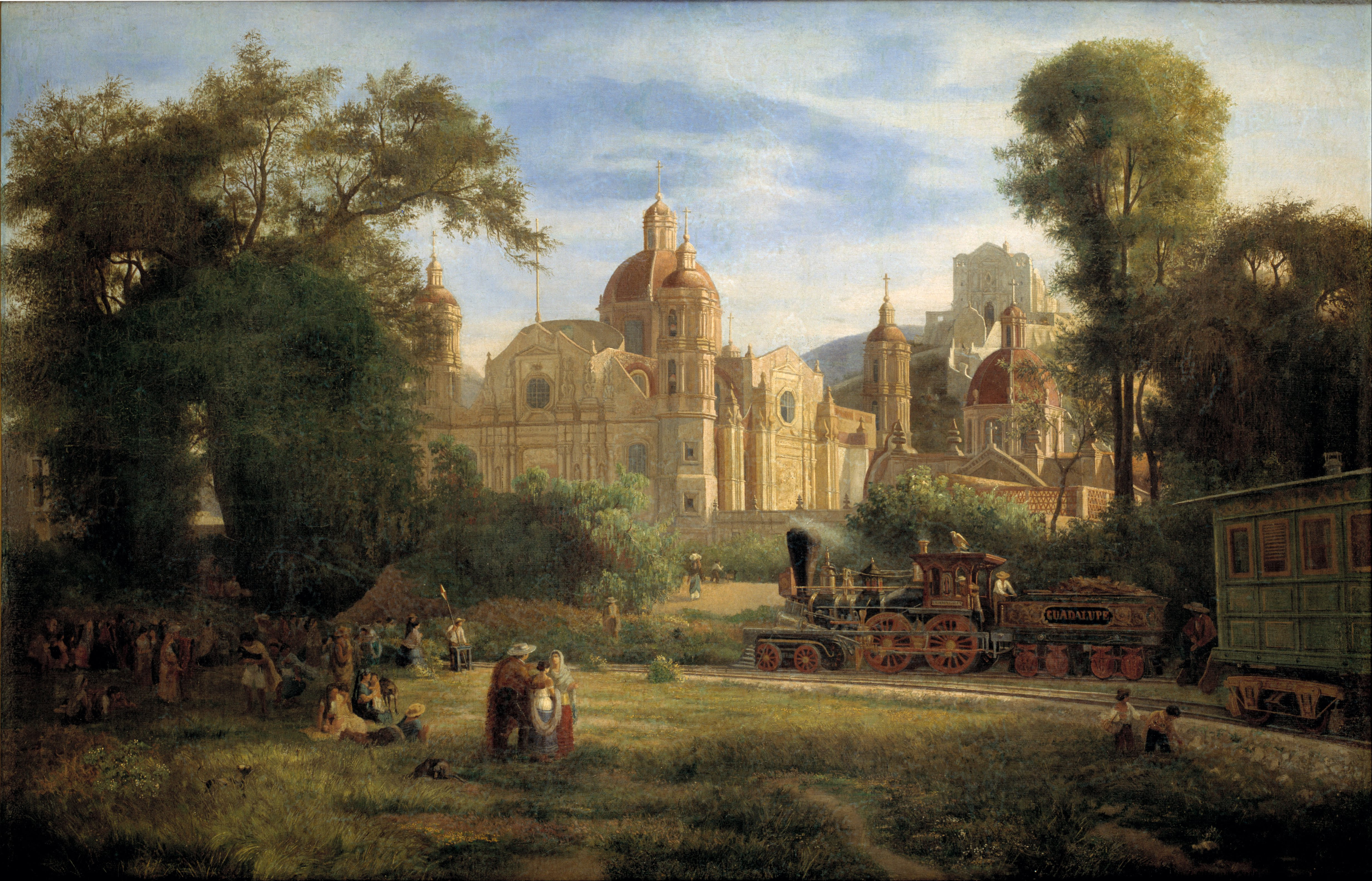
La Colegiata de Guadalupe (1859) by Luis Coto.

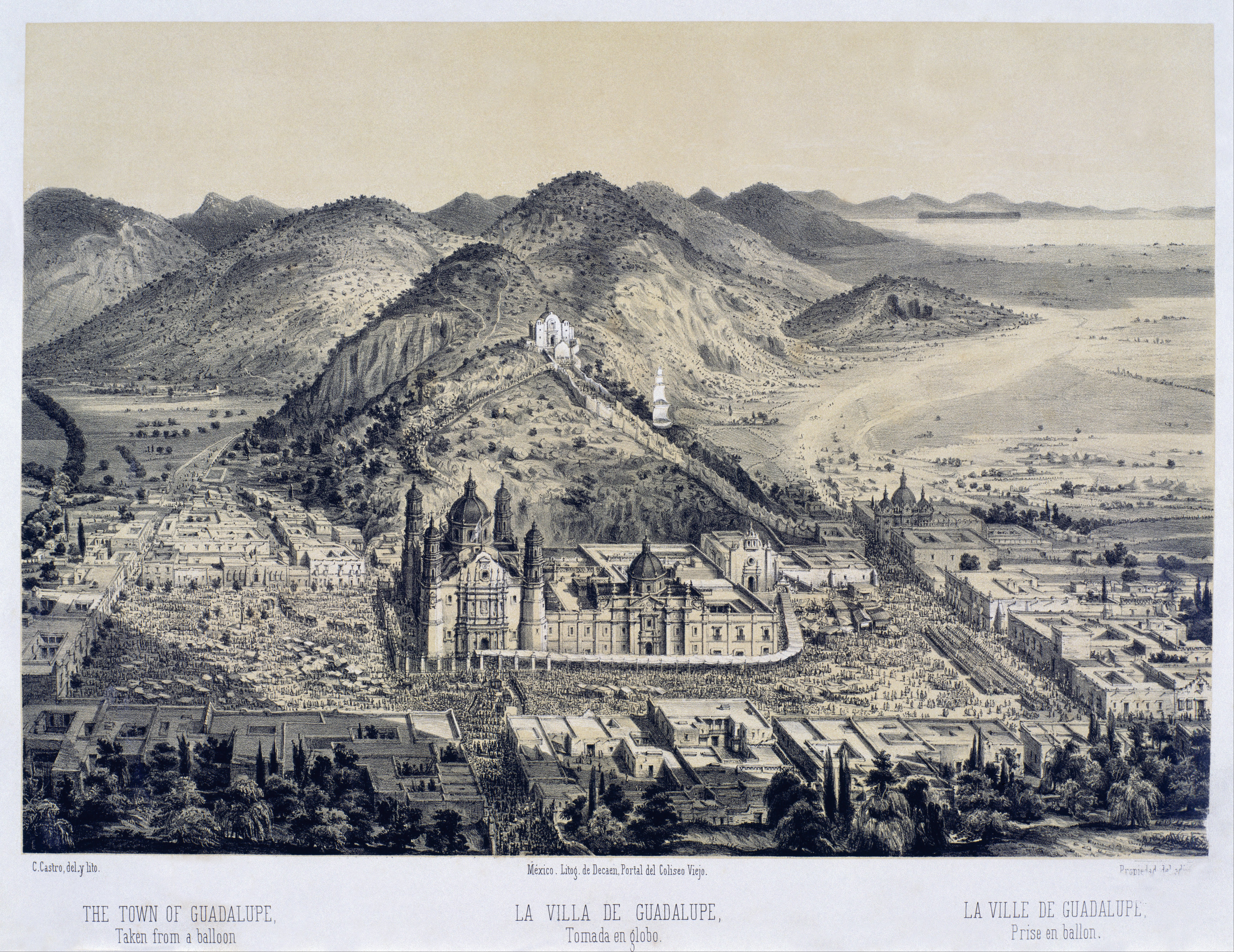
The Villa de Guadalupe Seen from a Hot-air Balloon, c. 1855, by Casimiro Castro. Museo Nacional de Arte.

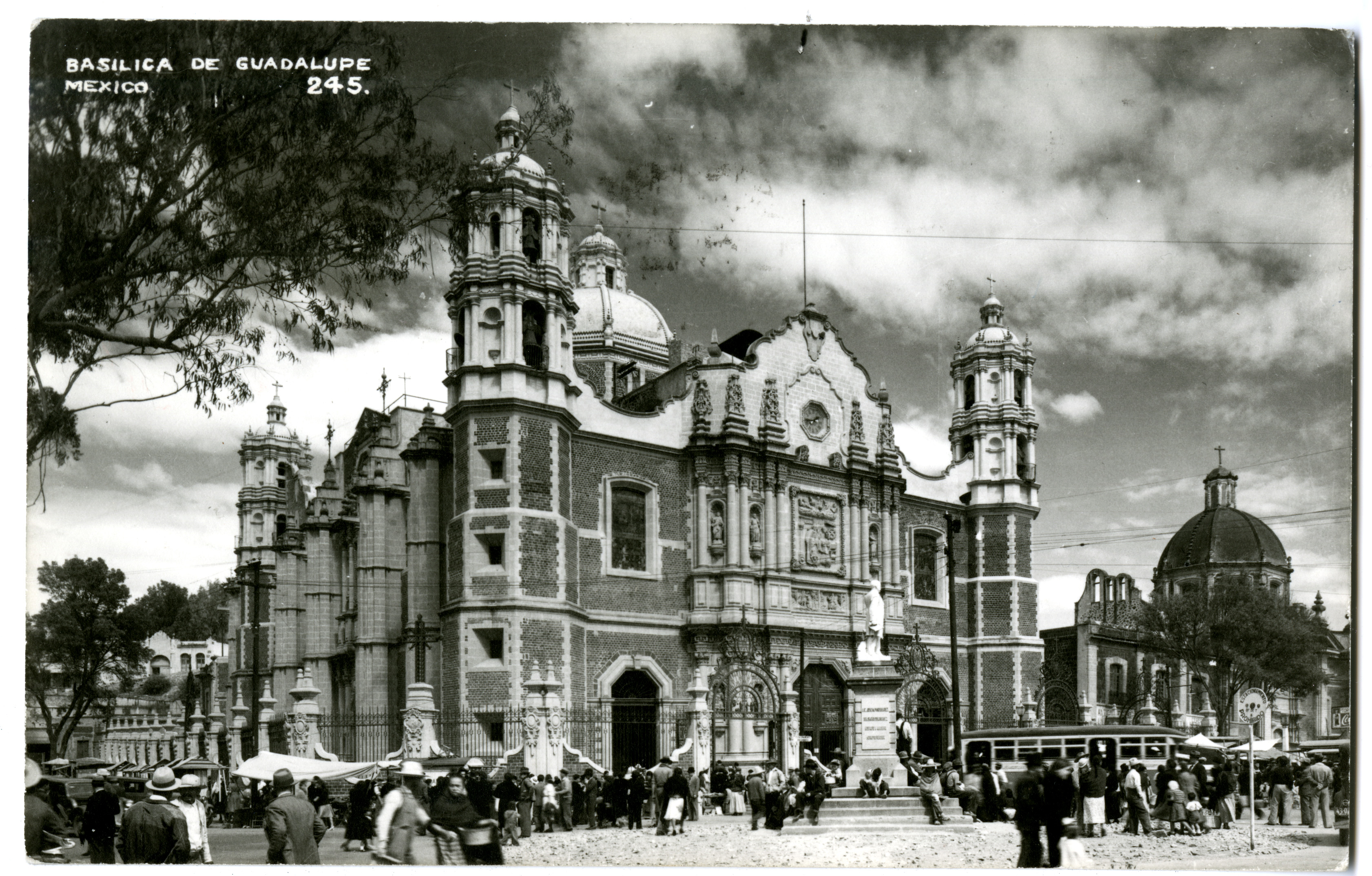
Guadalupe Basilica postcard, 1923. University of Dayton Libraries.

The sanctuary at Tepeyac developed around the veneration of the image of Our Lady of Guadalupe, the cloth image traditionally associated with Juan Diego's tilma and now enshrined in the basilica. In Catholic tradition, the image was miraculously imprinted on the tilma in 1531. Modern historians and art historians describe the extant object as a colonial-era painted cloth image produced in post-Conquest New Spain, with a documentary history that becomes clearer in the 16th century. The earliest surviving written witness to the apparition narrative is the 16th-century Nahuatl manuscript Nican Mopohua, while the first published account appeared in Miguel Sánchez's 1648 Imagen de la Virgen María.

The church now known as the Old Basilica of Guadalupe was built by the architect Pedro de Arrieta, its construction beginning in March 1695. On 1 May 1709, it opened with a solemn novena, and the image was transferred there at the dedication of the new sanctuary. In 1749 it received the title of collegiate church, meaning that, although it was not a cathedral, it had its own chapter and an abbot. Its freestanding portal, four octagonal corner towers, fifteen vaults, and octagonal dome with yellow-and-blue Talavera tile are among its most distinctive architectural features.

At the beginning of the 19th century, the construction of the nearby Capuchin convent contributed to serious damage to the church's walls and vaults, making repairs necessary and leading to a Neoclassical redecoration of the sanctuary in place of the earlier Baroque interior. Work began around 1804 and, with interruptions during the War of Independence, continued until 1836. The design was prepared by Agustín Paz and executed by the Neoclassicist architect Manuel Tolsá.

In 1904 the collegiate church was elevated to the rank of basilica. On 14 November 1921, a bomb concealed in a flower arrangement exploded at the main altar. The blast damaged the steps of the altar and stained-glass windows, but the image itself was not destroyed. A bent metal crucifix associated with the explosion was preserved in the basilica, and repairs to the altar resulted in the image being placed about one meter higher.

During the Cristero War, after the suspension of public worship in 1926, the original image was secretly removed for safekeeping and replaced at the basilica by a copy painted by Rafael Aguirre. It was reinstalled in June 1929, shortly before public worship resumed.

Continuing subsidence in the old structure and the growing number of pilgrims led to the construction of the present basilica between 1974 and 1976. The image was transferred to the new basilica on 12 October 1976.

== Religious complex of Tepeyac ==
The enclosure is made up of several churches and buildings, among which are those indicated below.

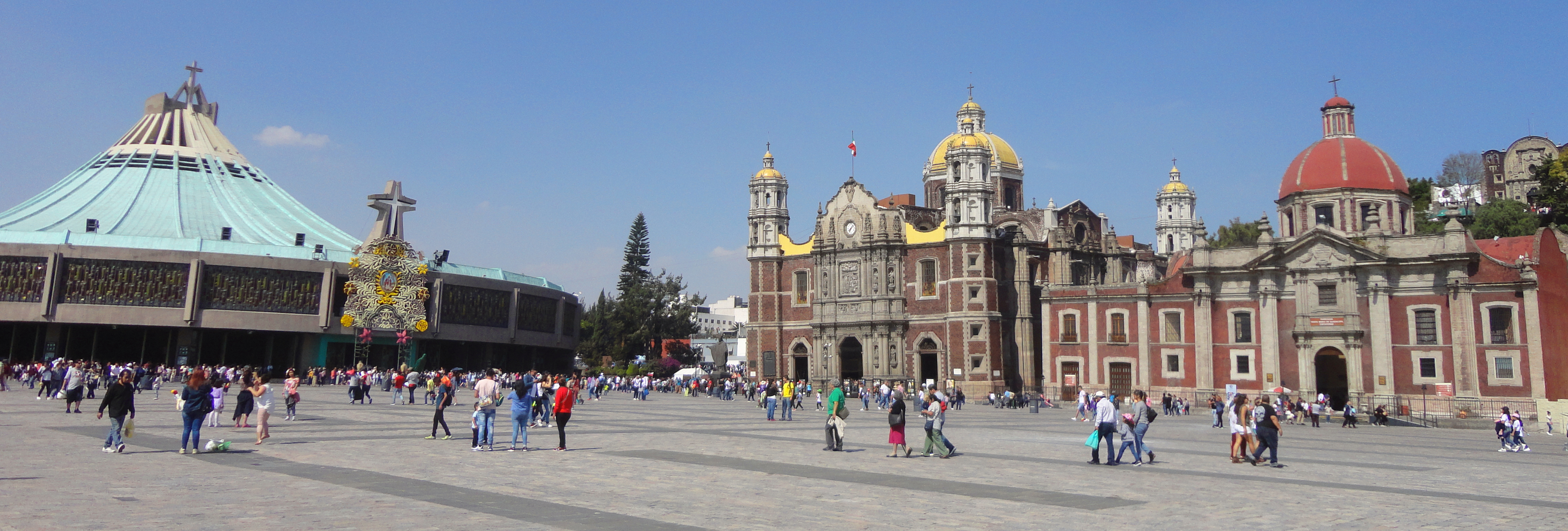
Panoramic view of the Atrio de las Américas.

=== Capilla de Indios (Indian Chapel) ===
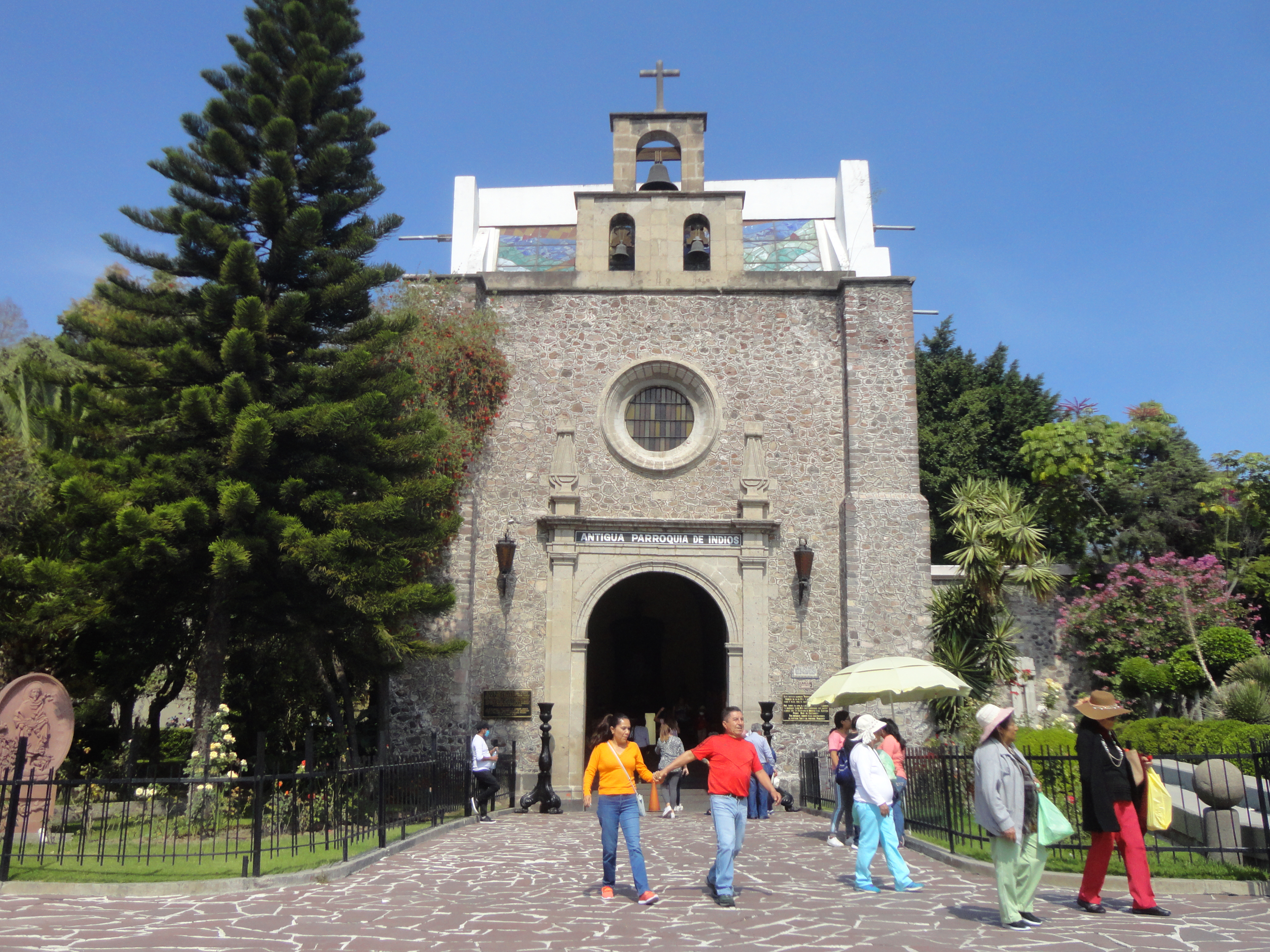
Old Capilla de Indios.

It is a church built in 1649 by Luis Lasso de la Vega. According to tradition, it housed the image of Our Lady of Guadalupe from 1695 to 1709 —the year in which it was transferred to the church known as the Old Basilica— and the standard of Miguel Hidalgo from 1853 to 1896. The name is due to the fact that this chapel was originally built for the cult of the indigenous population to the Virgin. The foundations of the first two churches dedicated to the Virgin that Friar Juan de Zumárraga ordered to be built in the place indicated by Saint Juan Diego, days after the declared apparition of the Virgin of Guadalupe, are preserved under it. From 1531 until his death in 1548, Juan Diego lived in this place (and his relics or remains are kept in the same place), in charge of taking care of the first place of worship.

=== Capilla del Cerrito ===
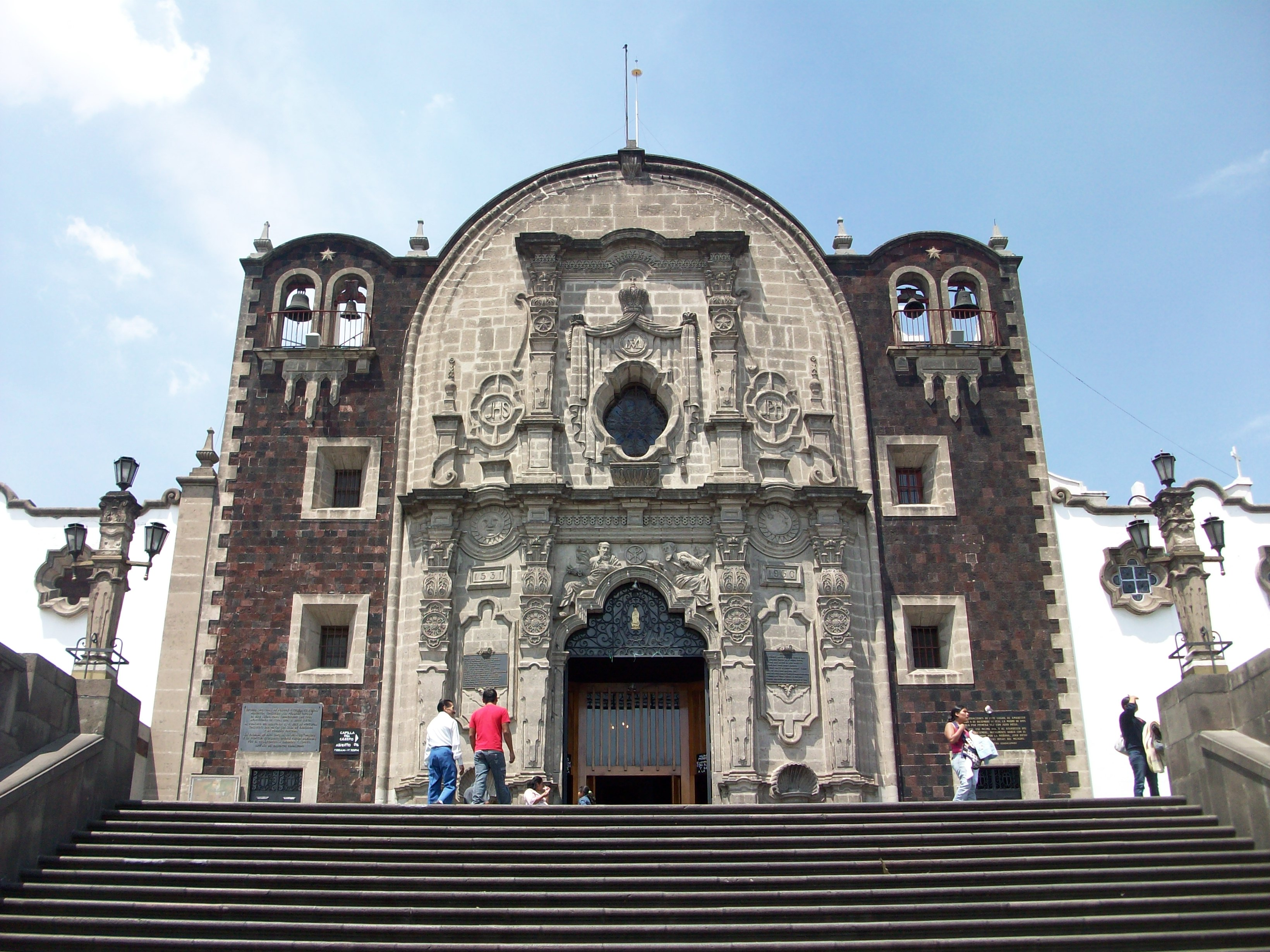
Capilla del Cerrito, Tepeyac.

It is the parish where the miracle of fresh flowers and the first of the apparitions of Santa María de Guadalupe are remembered. A first chapel was built on the Tepeyac hill in 1666 by the will of Cristóbal de Aguirre and Teresa Pelegina. Around 1740, Father J. de Montufar ordered the construction of the current temple, next to which the chaplain's house was built. which, when enlarged, was used for exercises. Inside you can see frescoes by the muralist painter Fernando Leal, who was entrusted with narrating the history of the apparitions, and who captures the meeting of cultures and the roots of faith. In times of New Spain, this chapel was consecrated to Saint Michael the Archangel, who is always represented protecting the Virgin (Apocalypse 12, 7). According to New Spain tradition, it was Saint Michael who brought down from heaven to earth the portrait of the Virgin, painted in the heavenly workshop. At the time he was the patron saint of Mexico City. In this chapel is currently the convent of the Carmelites, a cloistered community that carries out activities related to the care of the chapel and prayer for the world. The last of its chaplains was the archpriest priest, Carlos Vargos, who served as such along with his sacristan, Mr. Diego Velázquez.

=== Tepeyac Pantheon ===
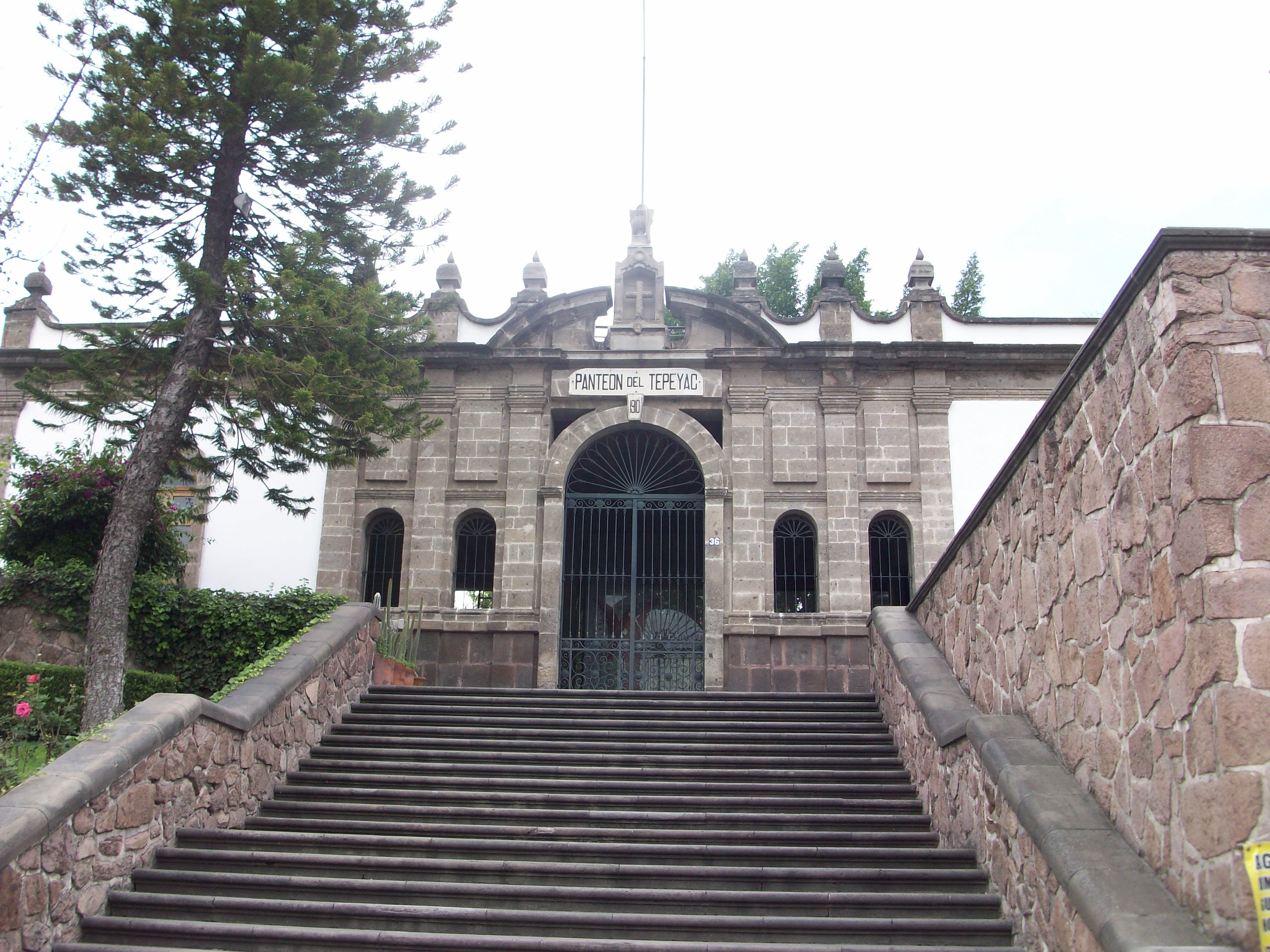
Entrance to the Tepeyac pantheon.

It is one of the cemeteries of the Colonial era that are still in activity. This is located on the western side of the top of the Tepeyac hill, extending to the rear of the hill, next to the Capilla del Cerrito. The cemetery was built as a complement to the Capilla del Cerrito in 1740. In this cemetery rest the remains of different personalities in the history of Mexico, such as: Xavier Villaurrutia, Lorenzo de la Hidalga, Ángel de Iturbide (son of Agustín de Iturbide), Delfina Ortega (first wife of Porfirio Díaz), Manuel María Contreras, Rafael Lucio Nájera, Gabriel Mancera, Antonio Martínez de Castro, José María Velasco Gómez, Bernardo Reyes, Ernesto Elorduy, Ponciano Díaz, the Chimalpopoca family (related to Cuauhtémoc), the former president of Mexico, Antonio López de Santa Anna and his wife Dolores Tosta. The Tepeyac pantheon is considered an area of national historical monuments, for which it is protected by the law of monuments and archaeological, artistic and historical zones.

=== Capilla del Pocito ===
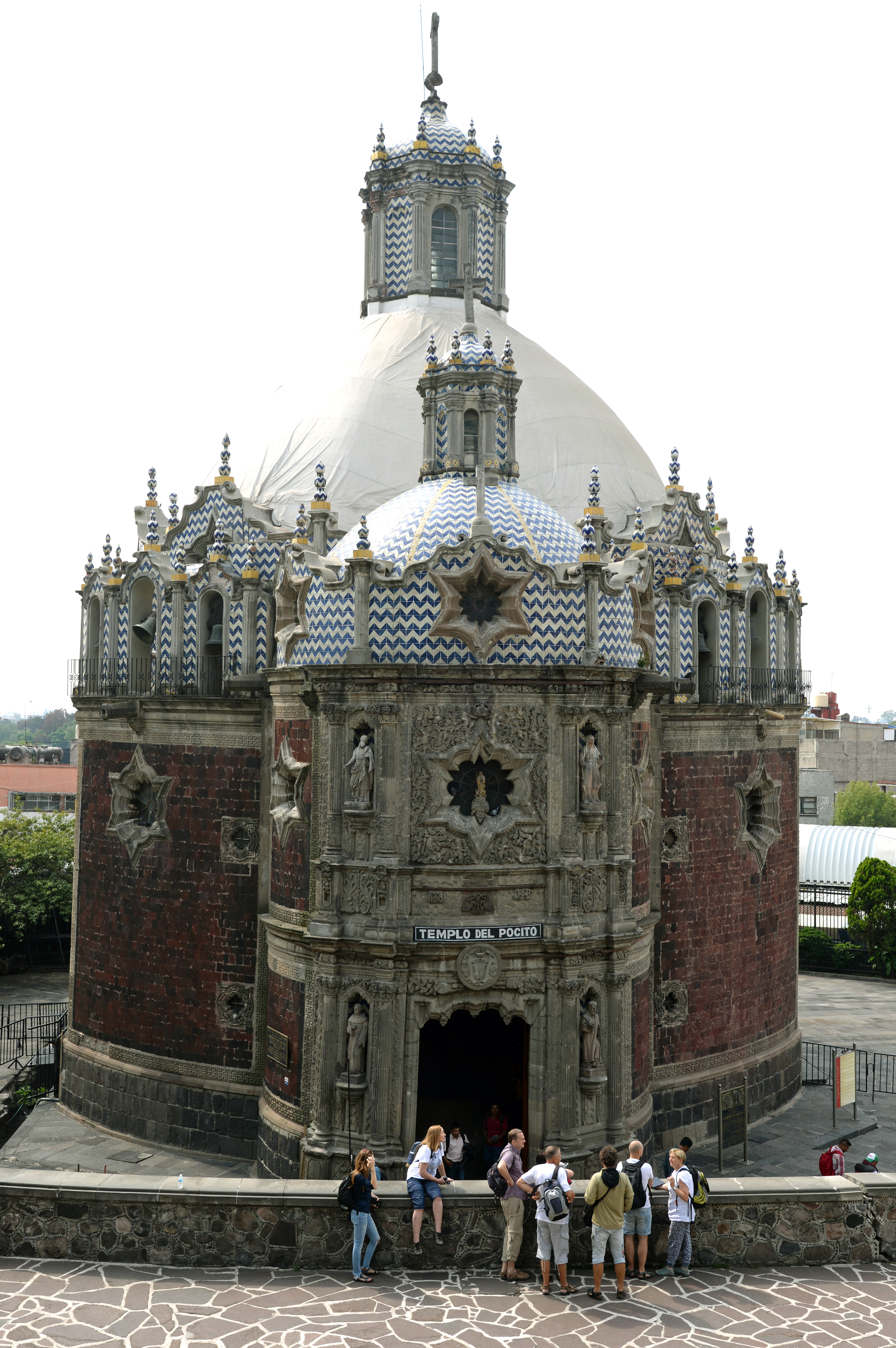
Capilla del Pocito

Temple located near the eastern slope of the Tepeyac hill. It was built from 1777 to 1791 and designed by the architect Francisco Guerrero y Torres. It was built on a well of water considered miraculous, so pilgrimages to the place soon began. A large number of sick people drank and washed their wounds on the same site, so it soon became a focus of infections. To control the epidemics, direct access to the well was prevented and a simple roof was built, but the pilgrimages continued. By 1777 the decision was made to build a temple on the site.

The particular hallmark of this small chapel, considered an architectural jewel of the Baroque style, is its shape, since its floor plan is the only one with a circular or central base built during the 18th century that is preserved in Mexico. This character allows the visitor to perceive the space little by little, as if it were hiding. The movement that the zigzag decoration gives to the dome, as well as the multiform lines used in the windows, contribute to creating this atmosphere of slow movement. All the symbols carried by the little angels painted on the dome are the Marian symbols that appear in the Lauretana Litany, the final part of praying the rosary: mirror of virtues, tower of David, morning star, etc. Another important element of the decoration is the Juan Diego who supports the wooden pulpit.

In 1815 the insurgent José María Morelos was allowed as his last wish to pray to the Virgin of Guadalupe in this temple before being executed in a nearby town in the current municipality of Ecatepec de Morelos.

With the creation works of the Atrio de las Américas in the 1950s, the temple went from being immersed in the urban layout to being isolated from it, as it is seen today.

=== Temple and Convent of Las Capuchinas ===
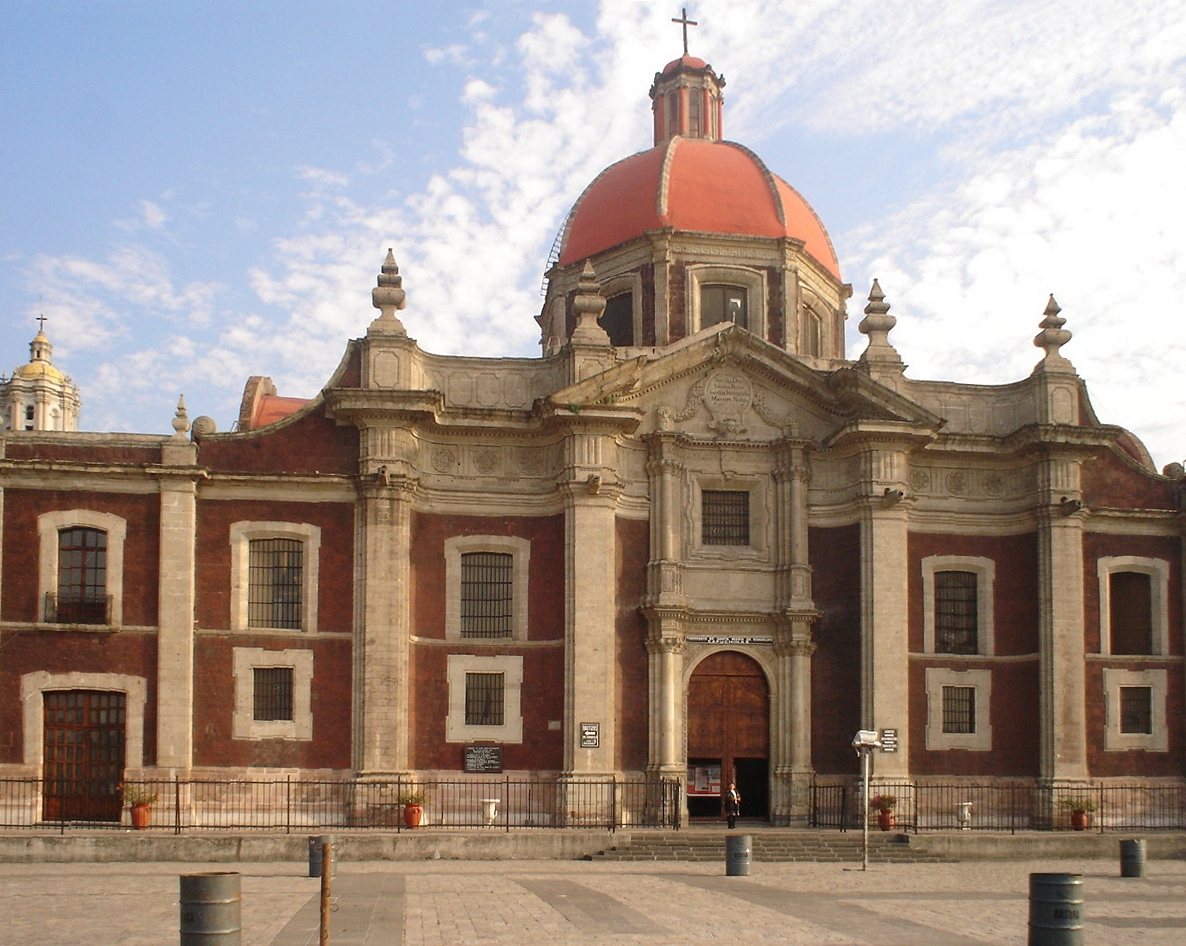
Temple and convent of Las Capuchinas.

The Convent and Parish of Santa María de Guadalupe – Capuchinas is a temple located on the eastern side of the Templo expiatorio a Cristo Rey. It was designed by the architect Ignacio Castera, on land donated by Salvador Beltrán, and built between 1792 and 1797, it was occupied by Capuchin mothers of Our Lady of Guadalupe. The convent was founded by the servant Sor María Ana, and exclaustrated on February 26, 1863. Throughout the history of the collegiate church has housed the Blessed Virgin of Guadalupe when the temple was closed for any reason, be it reform or remodeling. Due to the instability of the subsoil, the building was suffering from differential subsidence, so it had to be intervened between 1976 and 1982 with control piles, correcting the sinking of the temple, although the convent still finds itself with a considerable sinking.

==== Research facilities ====
The Historical Archive of the Basilica of Guadalupe is a collection of mainly New Spanish documents, divided into three branches: Clavería, Parish and Particular Secretary. It also houses the Musical Archive and Library, with scores by colonial 131 Mexican authors, 77 Italians, 23 Spanish and other nationalities. Within the complex is the Lorenzo Boturini Theological Library, with 70 years of active history and more than 22,000 volumes today.

==== Guadalupe Basilica Museum ====
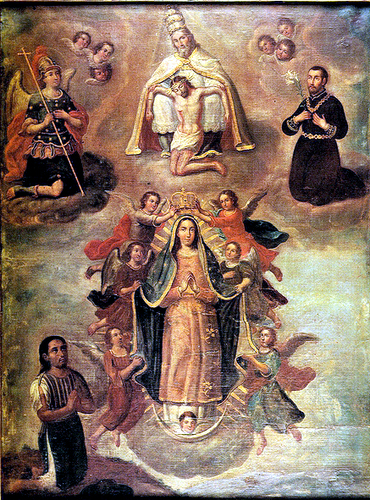
A painting from the colonial section of the museum of the Basilica of Guadalupe: The Guadalupan Assumption, c. 1731 by Anselmo López.

The museum, opened in 1941, in the north wing of Las Capuchinas Convent, houses an important collection of New Spanish art made up of nearly 4,000 cultural assets, many of them unique and unrepeatable, including paintings, sculptures, jewelry, gold and silver work, and others. It has works by the most important painters of New Spain, highlighting those of Cristóbal de Villalpando, Miguel Cabrera, Matías de Arteaga y Alfaro, Juan Correa, Juan Cordero, José de Ibarra, Sebastián López de Arteaga, Nicolás Rodríguez Juárez, Baltasar de Echave Ibía and José de Alcíbar. Its hall has more than 2,000 ex-votos dedicated to the Virgin of Guadalupe and is a space for temporary exhibitions.

=== Templo Expiatorio a Cristo Rey (Old Basilica of Guadalupe) ===
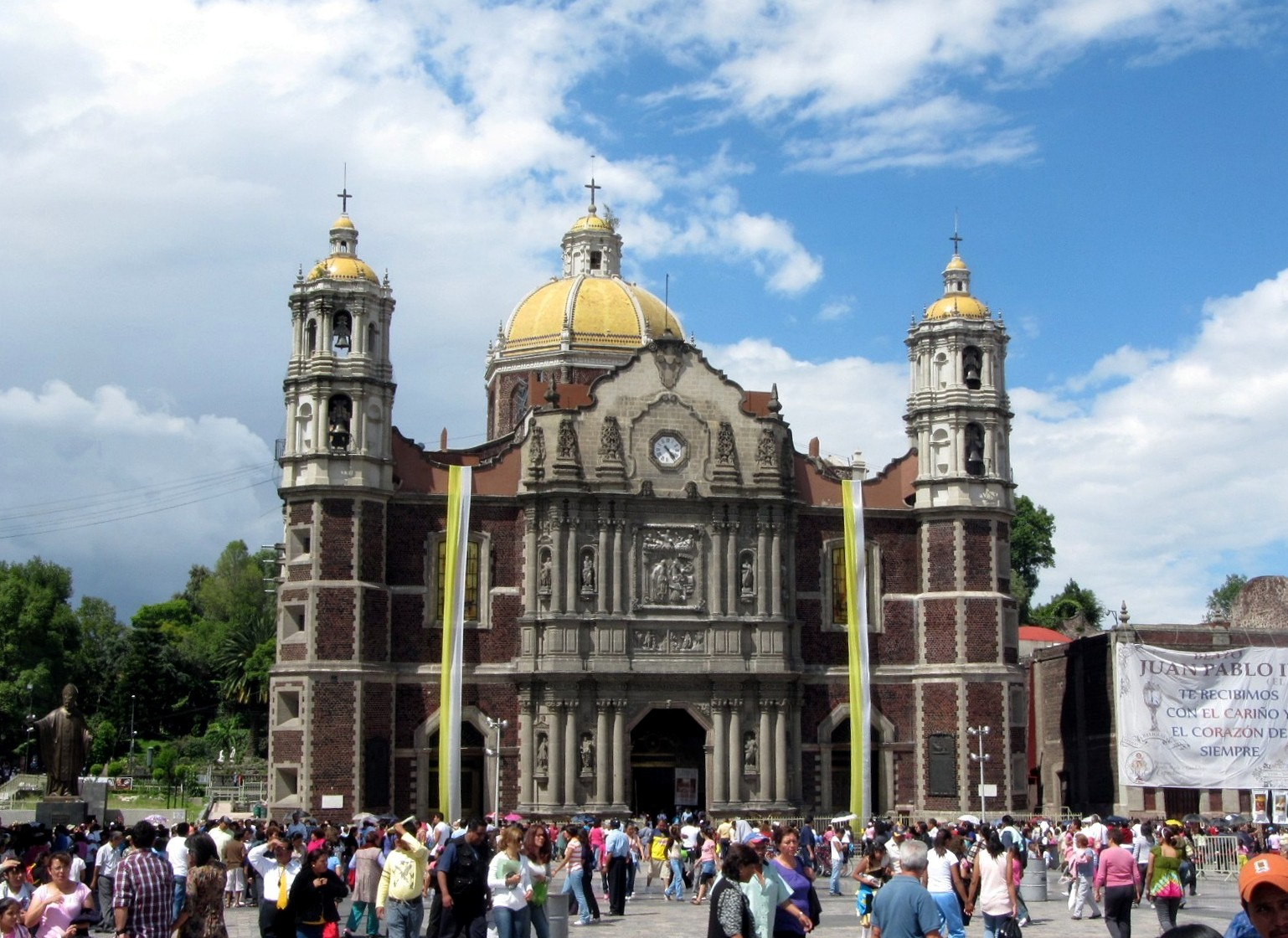
Templo Expiatorio a Cristo Rey.

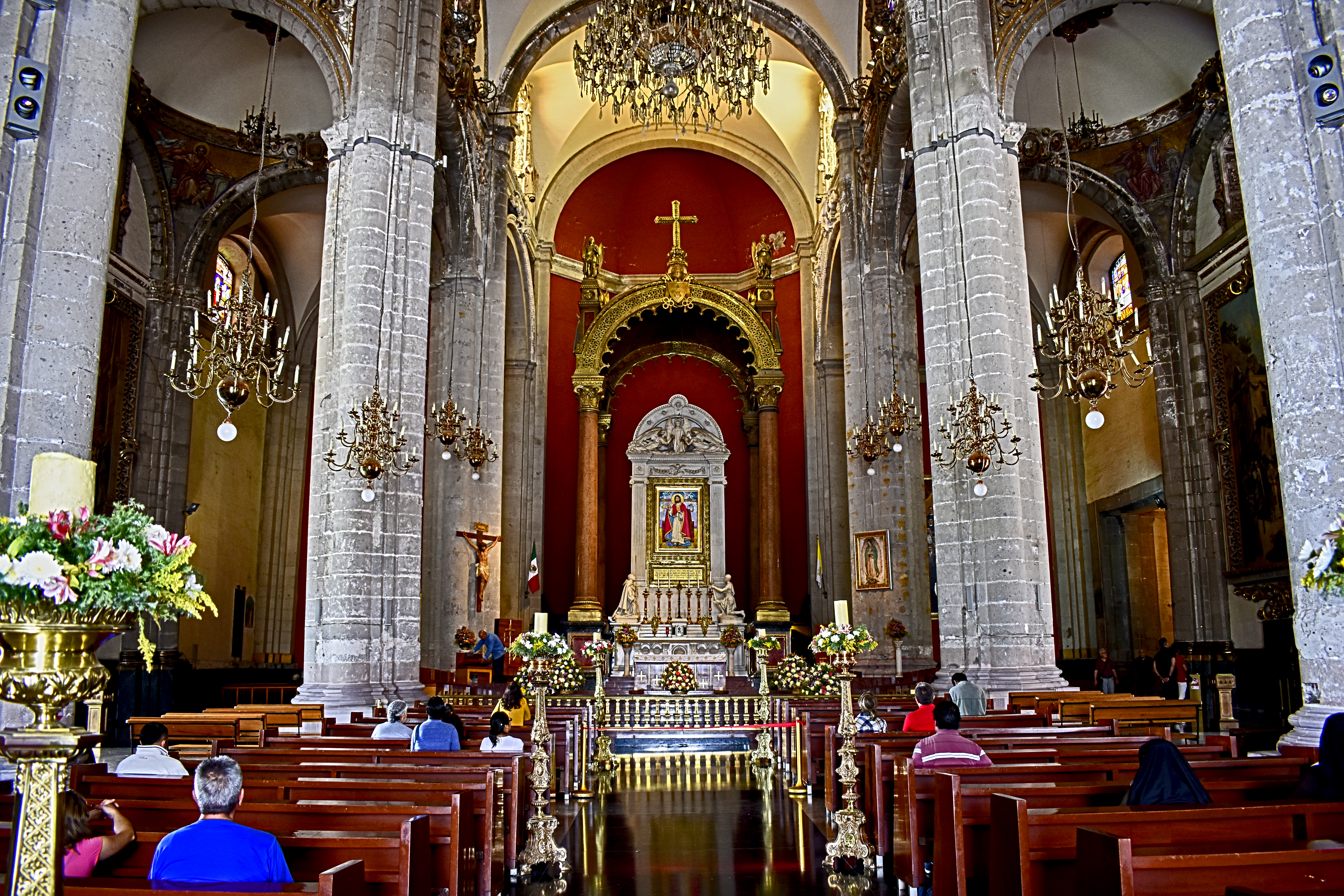
Interior of the Old Basilica.

Its construction began with the laying of the first stone on March 25, 1695, and ended in April 1709. The architect Pedro de Arrieta was the designer of this new temple for the Virgin. It has four octagonal towers at each of its corners, fifteen vaults and an octagonal dome with a lantern covered in Talavera yellow and blue. In 1749 it received the title of collegiate church, a designation given to certain Catholic temples that allows them to be managed both pastorally and administratively by a group of priests called "cabildo".

At the beginning of the 19th century, and due to the construction of the Capuchin convent on the east side, the temple suffered serious damage, for which it had to be repaired, and due to this reason it had a total change inside. The Baroque style disappeared and was replaced by the Neoclassical, with an altar designed by José Agustín Paz and Manuel Tolsá. Due to the appointment in 1887 of Pope Leo XIII of the Pontifical Coronation of the Virgin, again suffering from the construction on a fragile ground, the collegiate church was intervened again, replacing the altarpiece with a white Carrara marble altar, designed by Juan Agea Salomé Pina and carved by Carlo Nicoli, covered with a canopy of Scottish granite columns weighing 4 tons each and a bronze vault. The entire interior of the church was also restored and enlarged, placing five monumental paintings on its walls with passages from Guadalupan history. The works concluded on October 12, 1895.

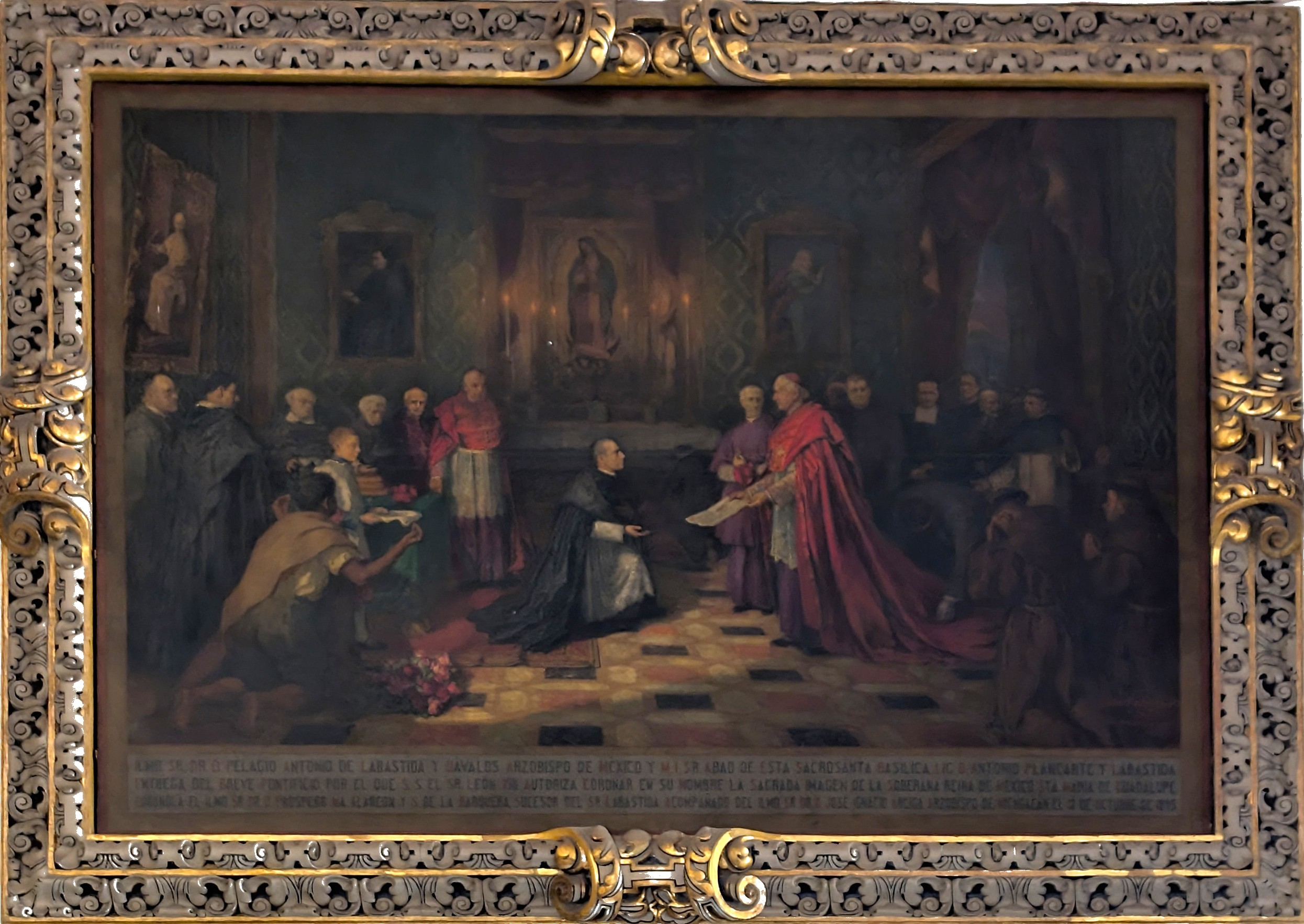
Painting depicting the authorization of the coronation of Our Lady of Guadalupe. 1930 by Joan Fabregat Milá

Among the monumental paintings on the walls, located above the entrance from the right side of the church, is a 6m x 4.5m oil painting by artist Joan Fabregat Milá depicting the authorization of the coronation of Our Lady of Guadalupe in 1740 by the Vatican.

In 1904, the collegiate church was elevated to the rank of basilica, by papal decision. The papal coronation was on December 12 of that same year.

=== New Basilica of Guadalupe (modern basilica) ===
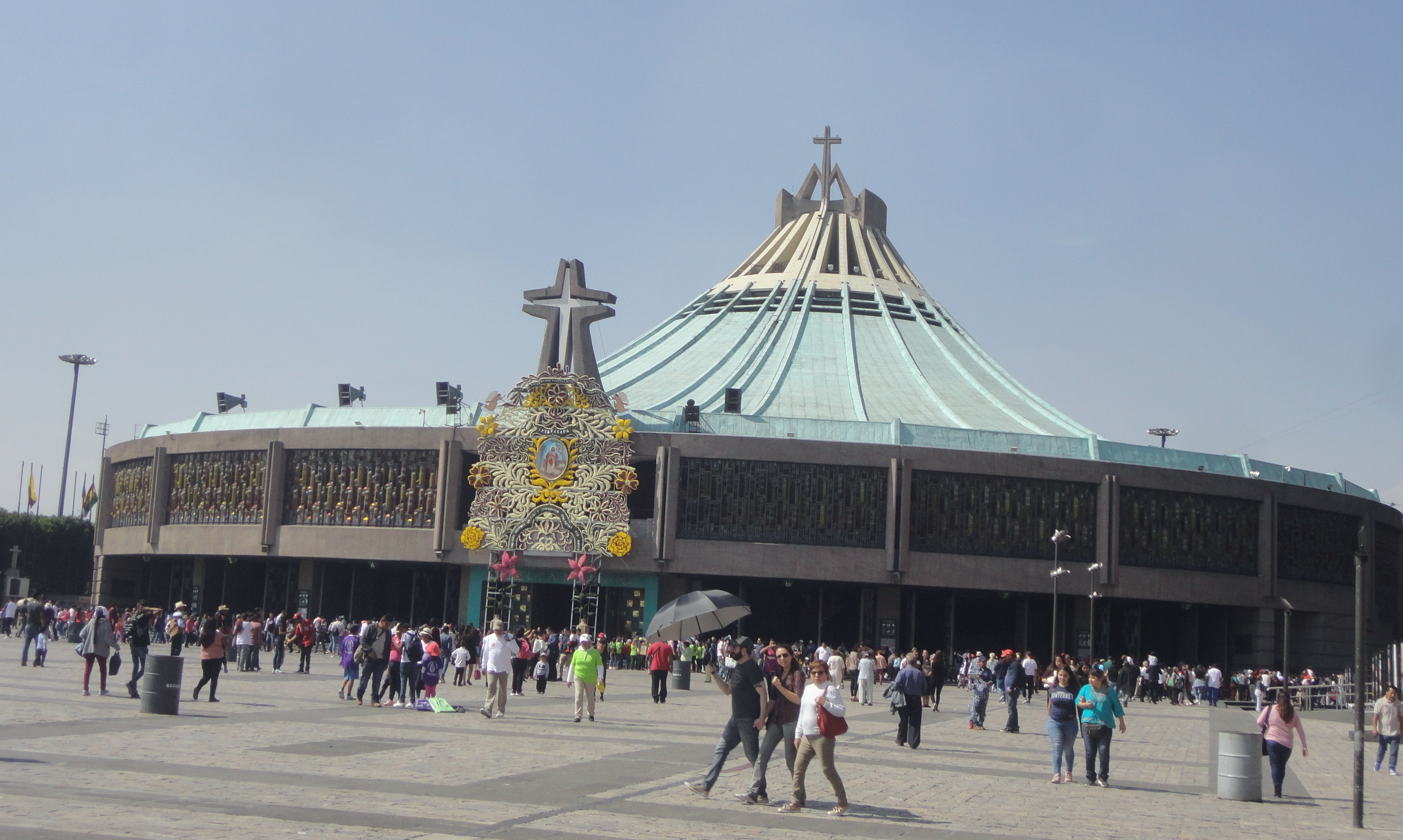
New Basilica of Guadalupe

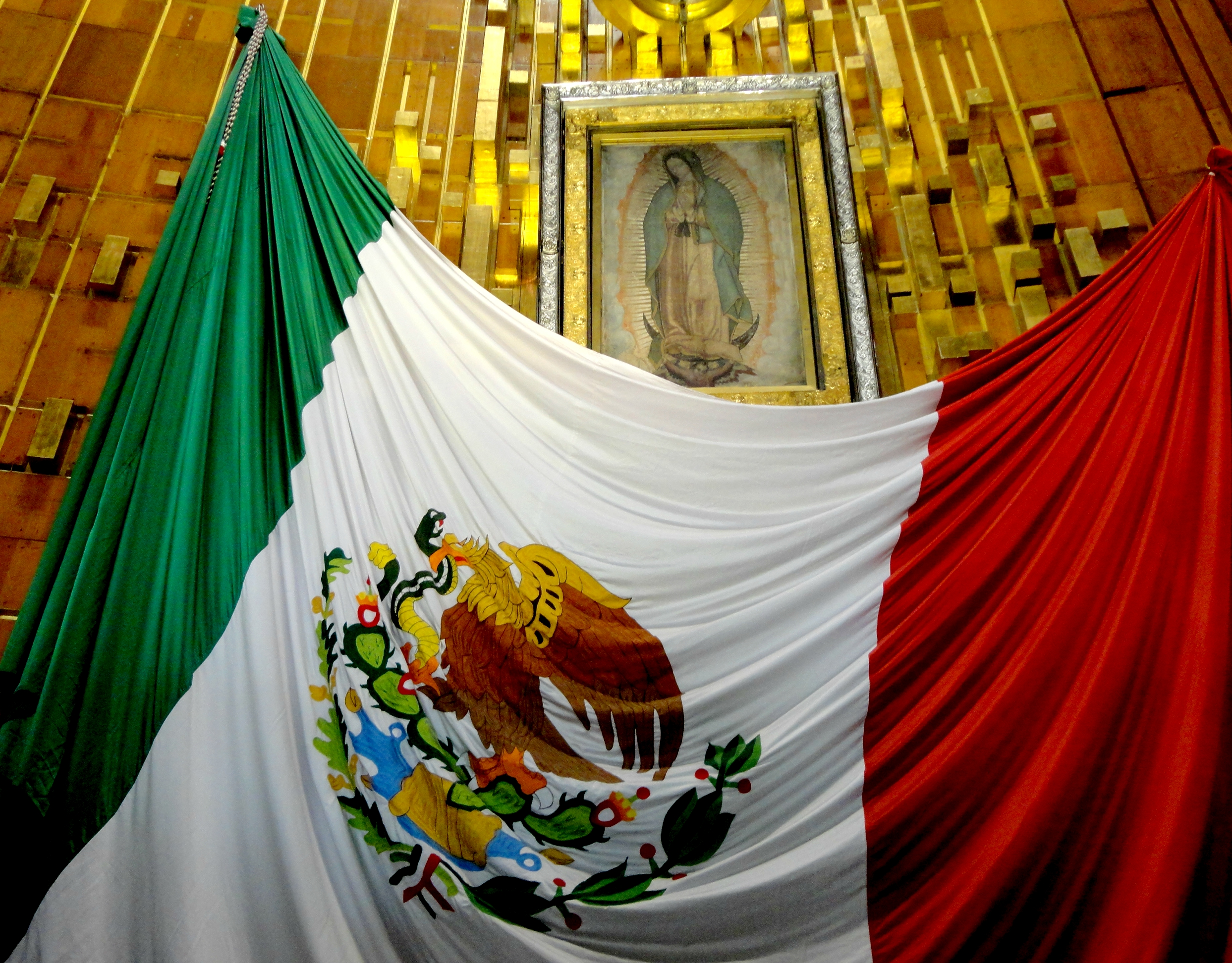
First image of the Virgin of Guadalupe housed in the New Basilica

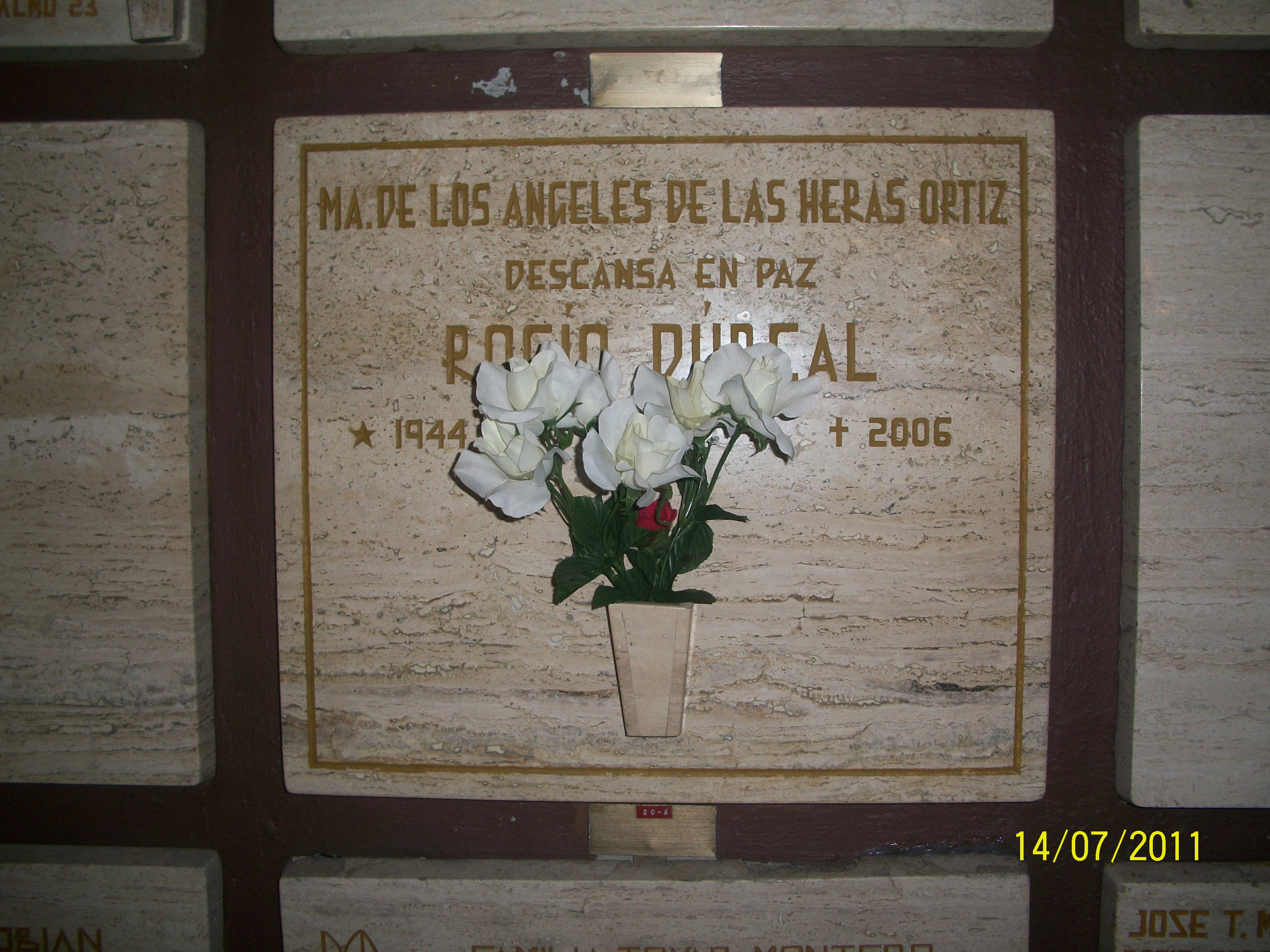
Rocío Dúrcal's crypt (a Spaniard singer) within the crypts in the basilica.

The new basilica is to the west of the Atrio de las Américas and to the south of the Tepeyac hill. It was built due to the need to house the image of the Virgin of Guadalupe and allow access to a greater number of pilgrims, as the old temple was unstable and dangerous. The new building was designed by the architects: José Luis Benlliure Galán, Pedro Ramírez Vázquez, Alejandro Schoenhofer, Friar Gabriel Chávez de la Mora, Antonio S. Gómez Palacio and Javier García Lascuráin. Its construction began in 1974 during the abbotship of Monsignor Guillermo Schulenburg, with Odilón Ramírez Pelayo, the lawyer of the Basilica of Guadalupe for many years, in charge of the legal procedures for the acquisition of the land. Pelayo also contracted the architects to design the building, and managed the construction of the small chapel dedicated to the New Basilica of Guadalupe inside St. Peter's Basilica in Vatican City. On October 12, 1976, when the work was finished, the Guadalupe image was taken in procession to its new sanctuary. Having a circular shape to symbolize the tent that housed the Ark of the Covenant on its march through the desert, the building was built with reinforced concrete for the roof structure, covered with green oxidized copper sheets.

In 1980, Monsignor Guillermo Schulenburg, abbot of the basilica, asked Pedro Medina Guzmán for a mural painting for the tabernacle, which was finished at the end of the same year called "The gift of the Resurrection". As well as the murals found in the crypts with the theme of the apparitions of the Virgin of Guadalupe to San Juan Diego.

It has seven entrances to the front, above which there is an open chapel with a certain reminiscence of the atriums of the 16th century, from which mass can be celebrated for those present in the atrium. Above this chapel is a large cross, and above it and at the top of the roof is a monogram of Mary with another cross in the center. To prevent the settling of the land that occurred in surrounding buildings, this was built using 344 control piles, the work of engineer Manuel González Flores.

As the interior is circular and self-supporting (without supporting members to obstruct the view), the image of the Virgin of Guadalupe can be seen from everywhere inside the basilica. It is behind the altar, under a large cross, on a wall with a finish similar to the ceiling. For better visibility of the image, a walkway was built under the altar with conveyor belts. The altar has a different finish, made of marble and is at various levels above the assembly.

This venue has received the visit of heads of state, athletes, politicians, artists and leaders of several Christian denominations. Pope John Paul II visited five times, in 1979, 1990 (on the occasion of the beatification of Saint Juan Diego), 1993, 1999 (at the close of the Synod of Bishops of America) and 2002 (for the canonization of Saint Juan Diego). In February 2016 Pope Francis officiated a mass at the main altar of the Basilica of Guadalupe.

== Gallery ==
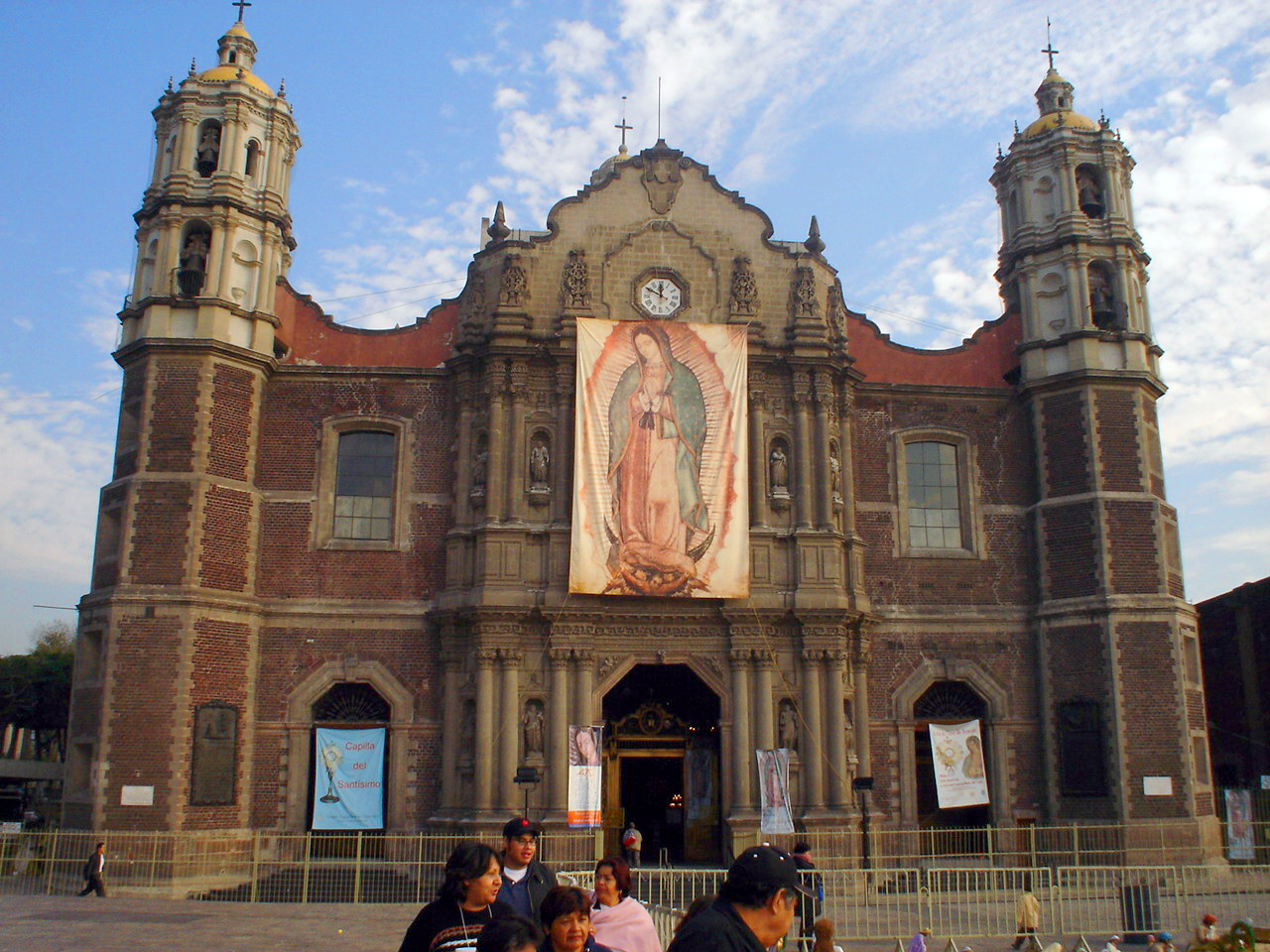
Old Sanctuary of the Virgin of Guadalupe

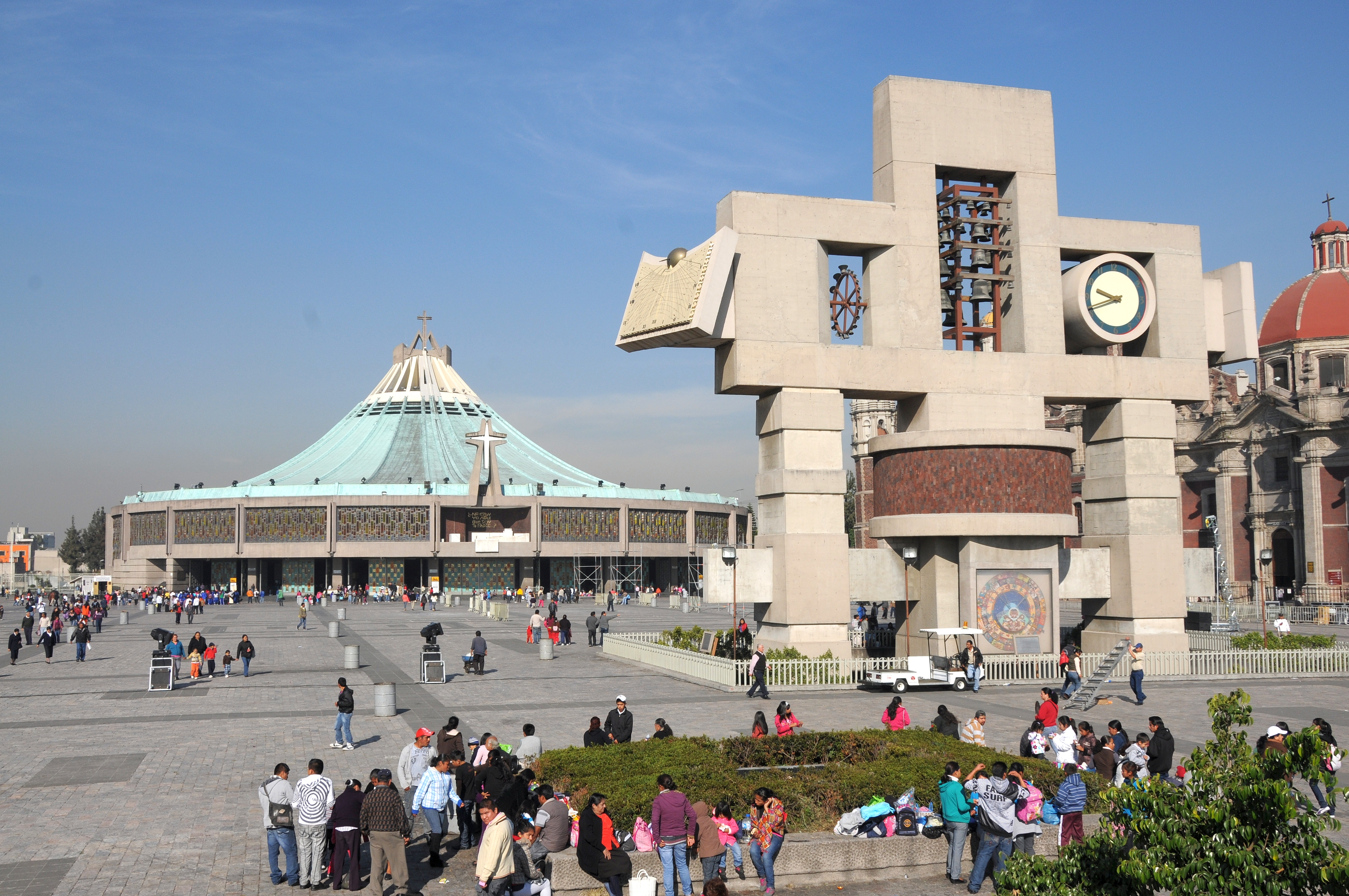
Modern basilica

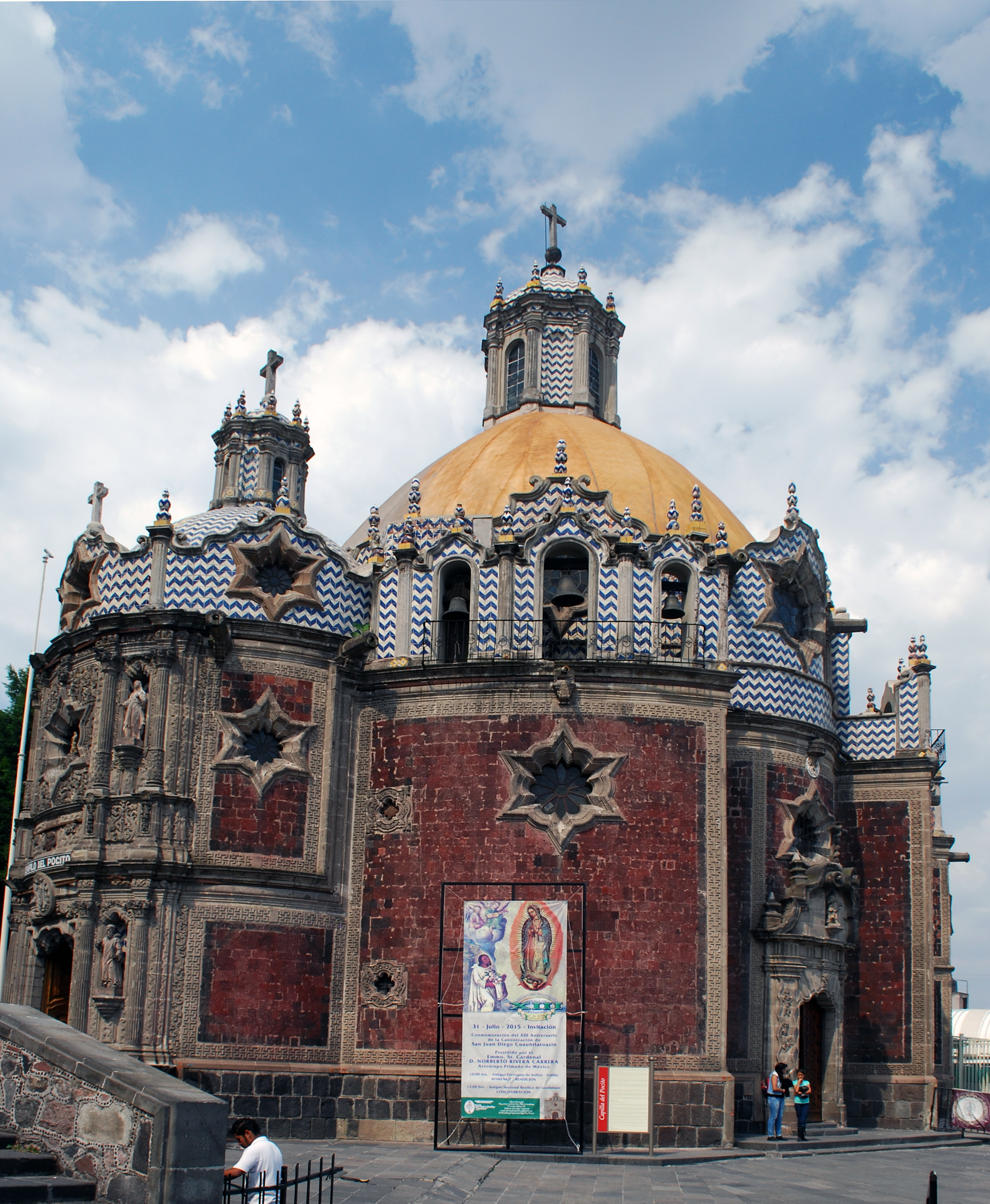
Pocito Chapel

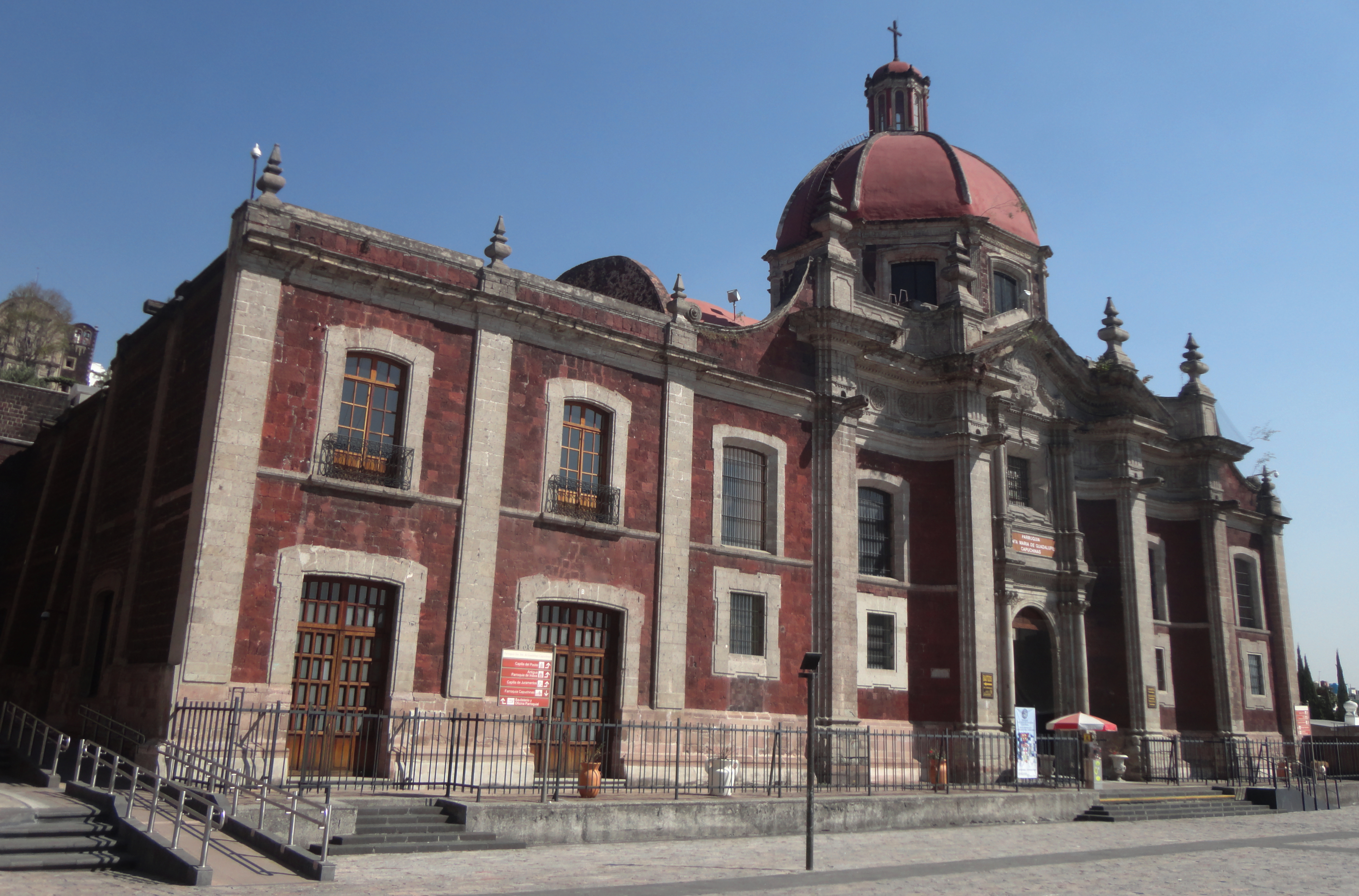
The Capuchin Nuns' Temple

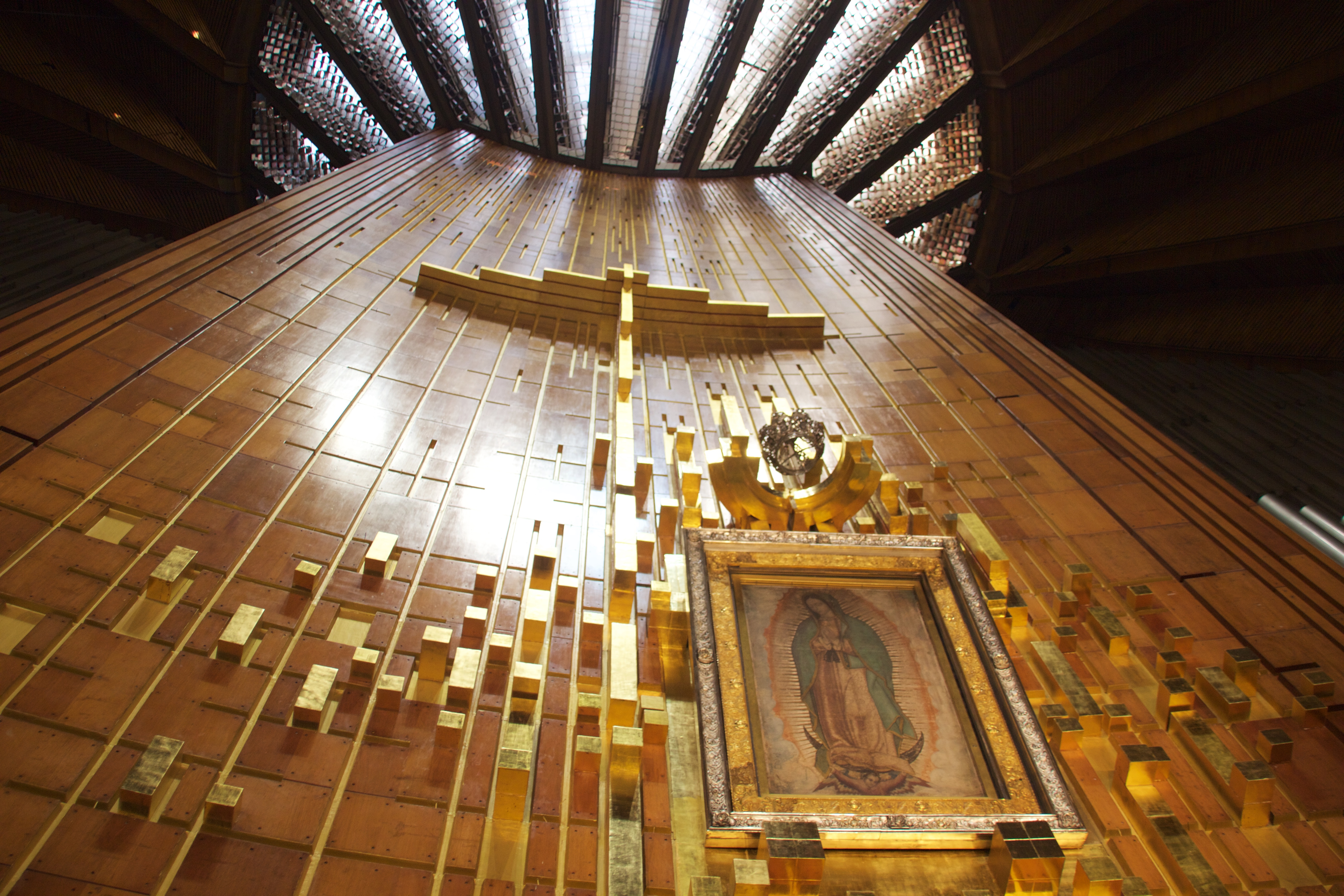
Image of Our Lady of Guadalupe in the new basilica

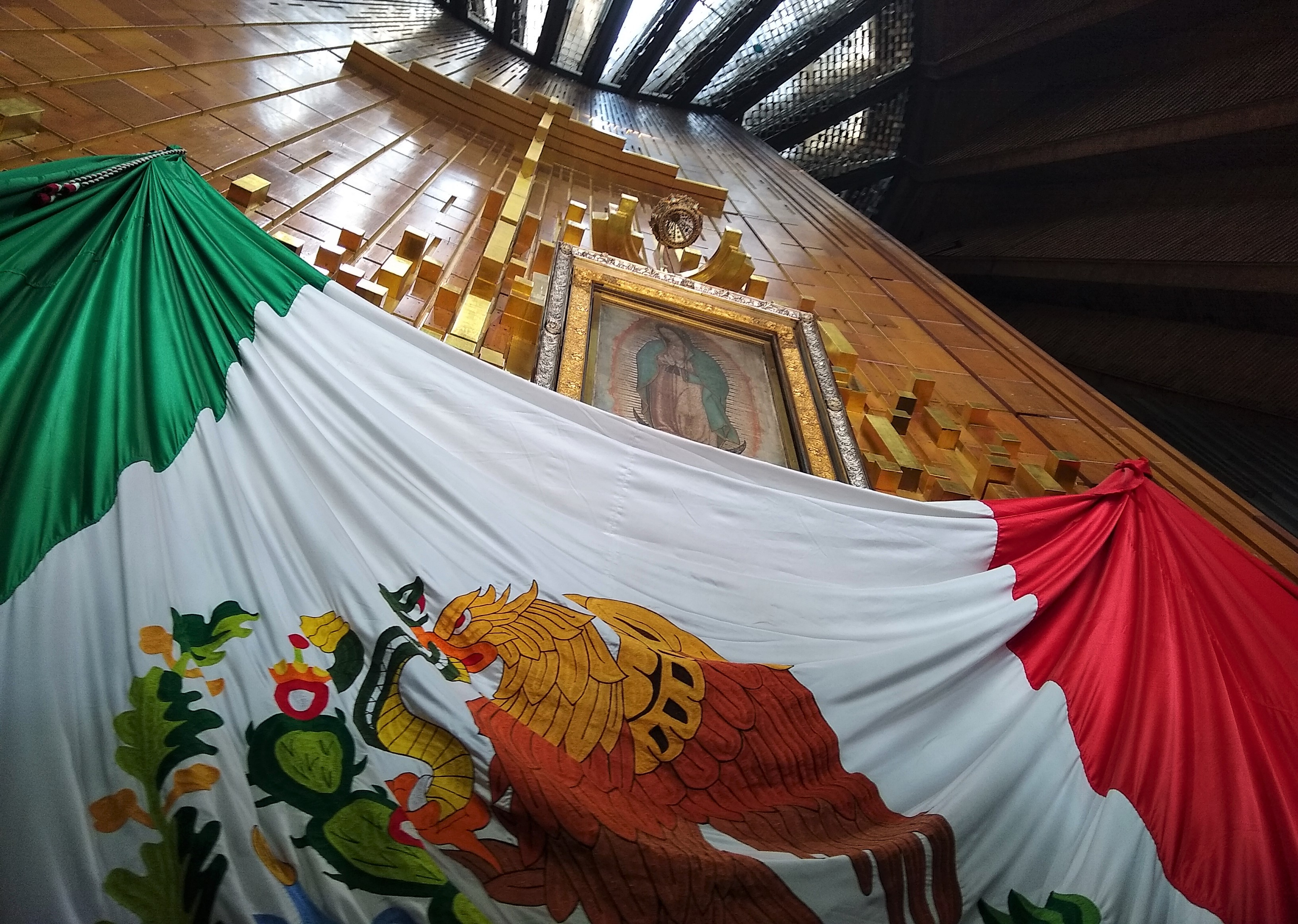
Basilica of Our Lady of Guadalupe CDMX 2021

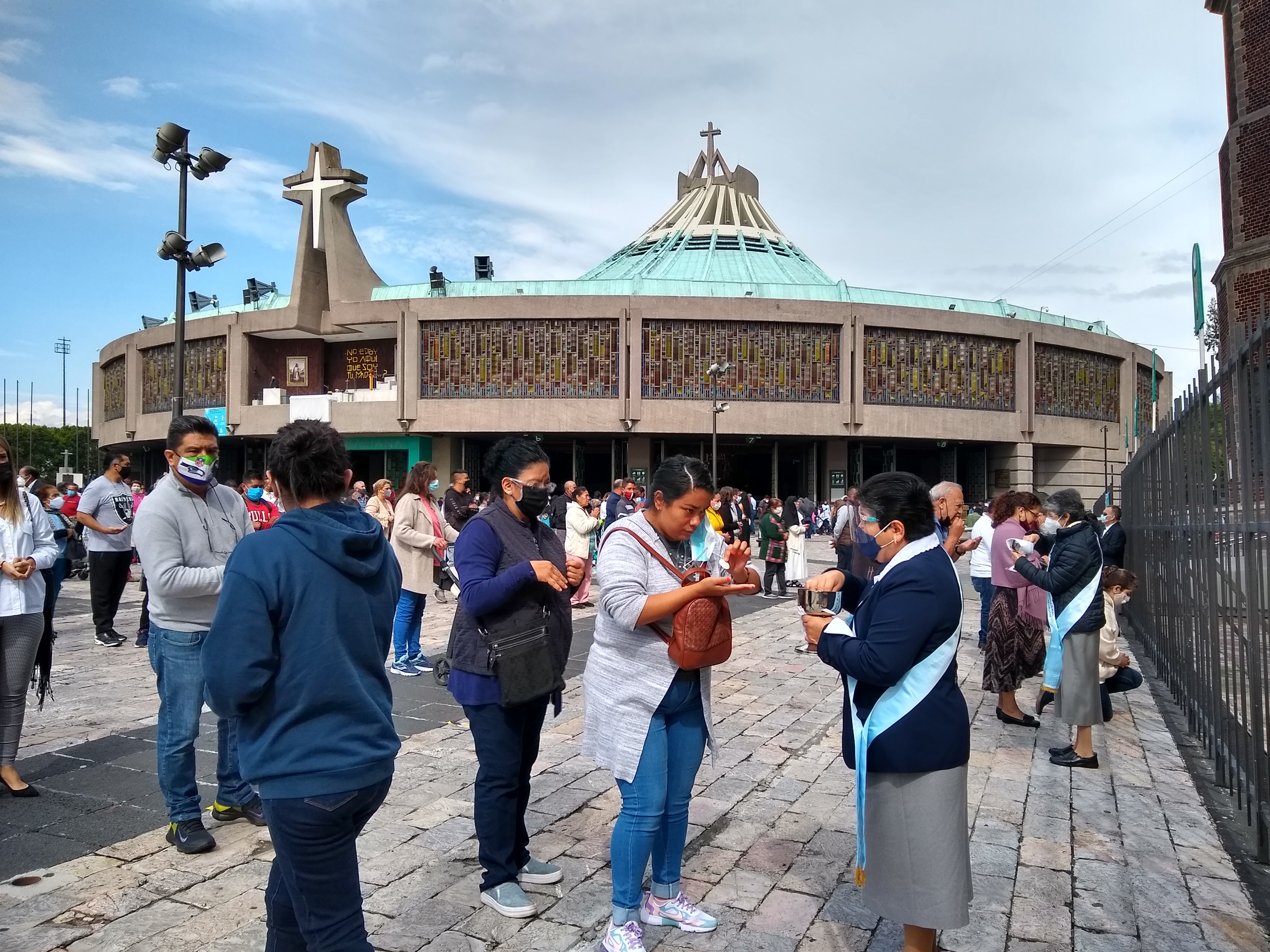
Basilica of Our Lady of Guadalupe CDMX - receiving communion

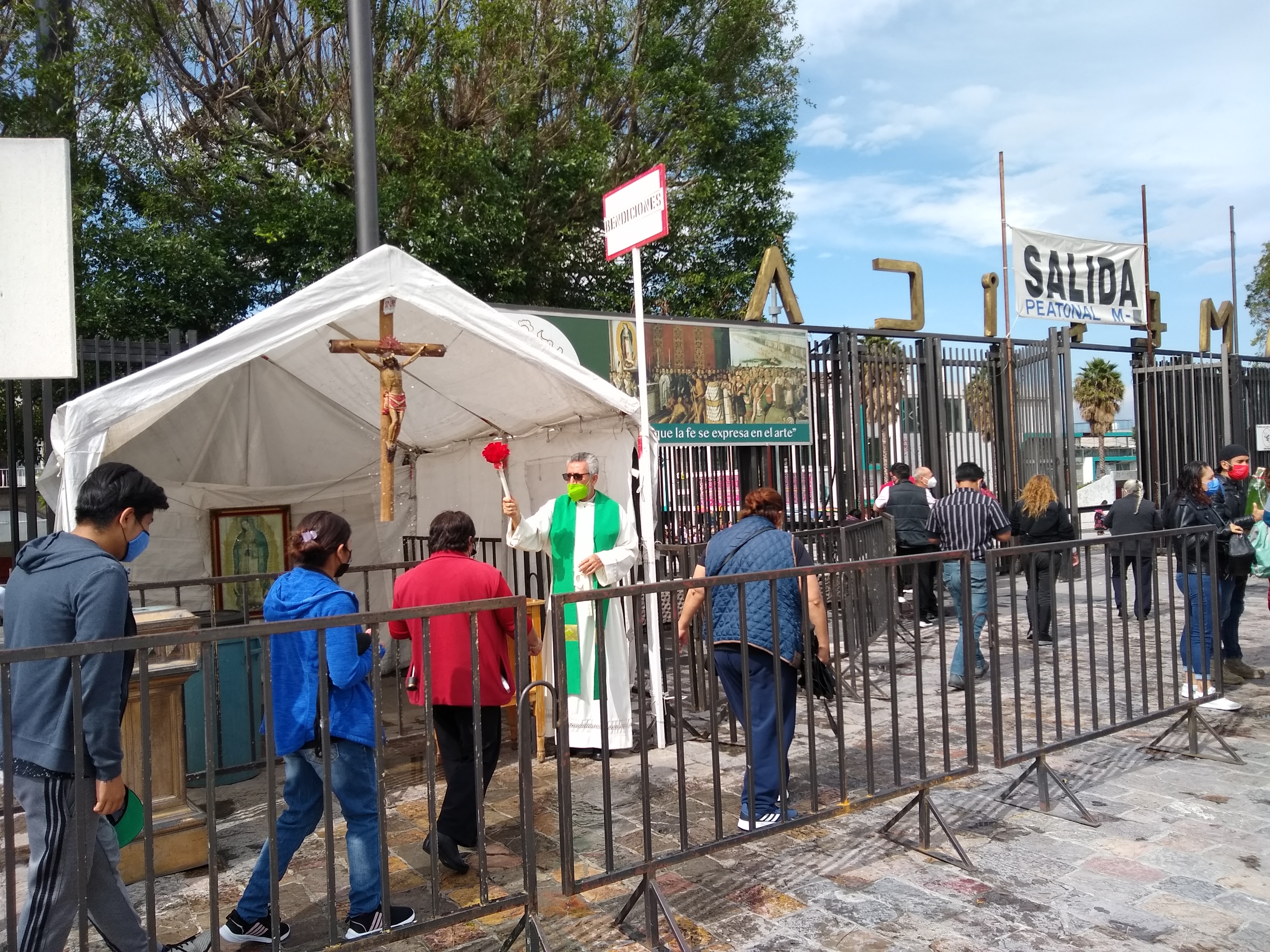
Basilica of Our Lady of Guadalupe CDMX - sprinkling of holy water

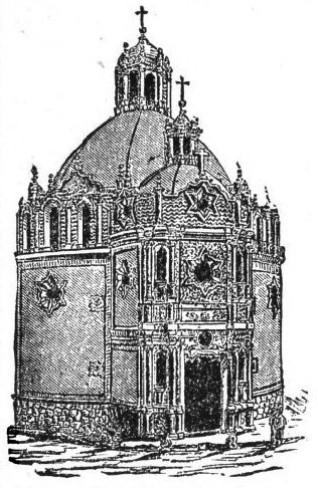
Pocito Chapel in 1888 by Nellie Bly.

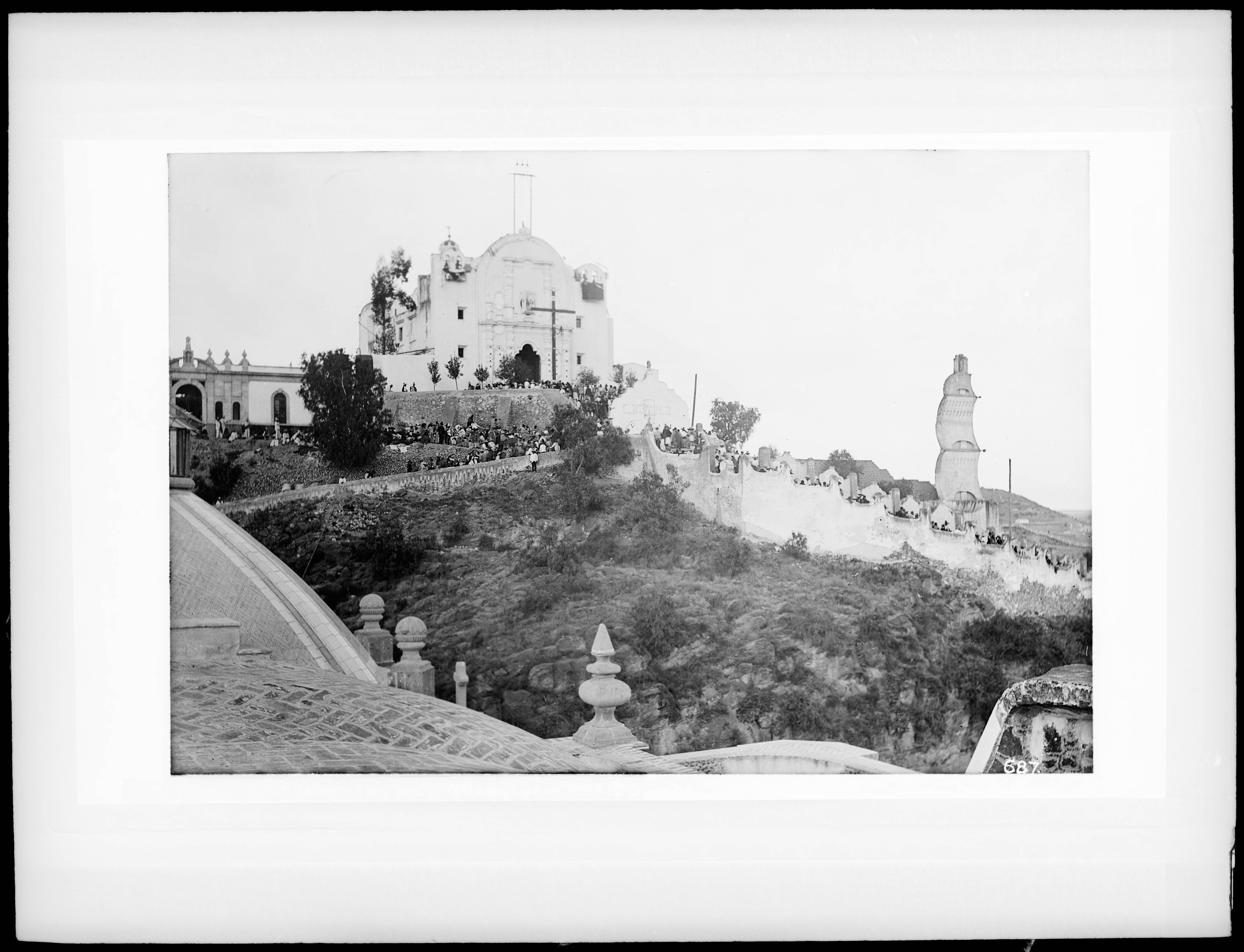
Capilla del Cerrito, 1900

== See also ==
- List of colonial churches in Mexico City
- Mexico City Metropolitan Cathedral
- List of churches under the patronage of Our Lady of Guadalupe
- Rocío Dúrcal, whose final resting place is in this church
- Monastery of Saint Mary of Guadalupe, Extremadura, Spain
- List of Christian pilgrimage sites
