= Ramón Calderón Batres =

Mexican Roman Catholic bishop (born 1938)

Ramón Calderón Batres (born 29 October 1938) is a Mexican Roman Catholic bishop.

Calderón Batres was ordained to the priesthood in 1962. He served as bishop of the Roman Catholic Diocese of Linares, Mexico, from 1988 to 2014.
