= Roman Catholic Diocese of Tampico =

Latin Catholic jurisdiction in Mexico

Diocese of Tampico Dioecesis Tampicensis Diócesis de Tampico
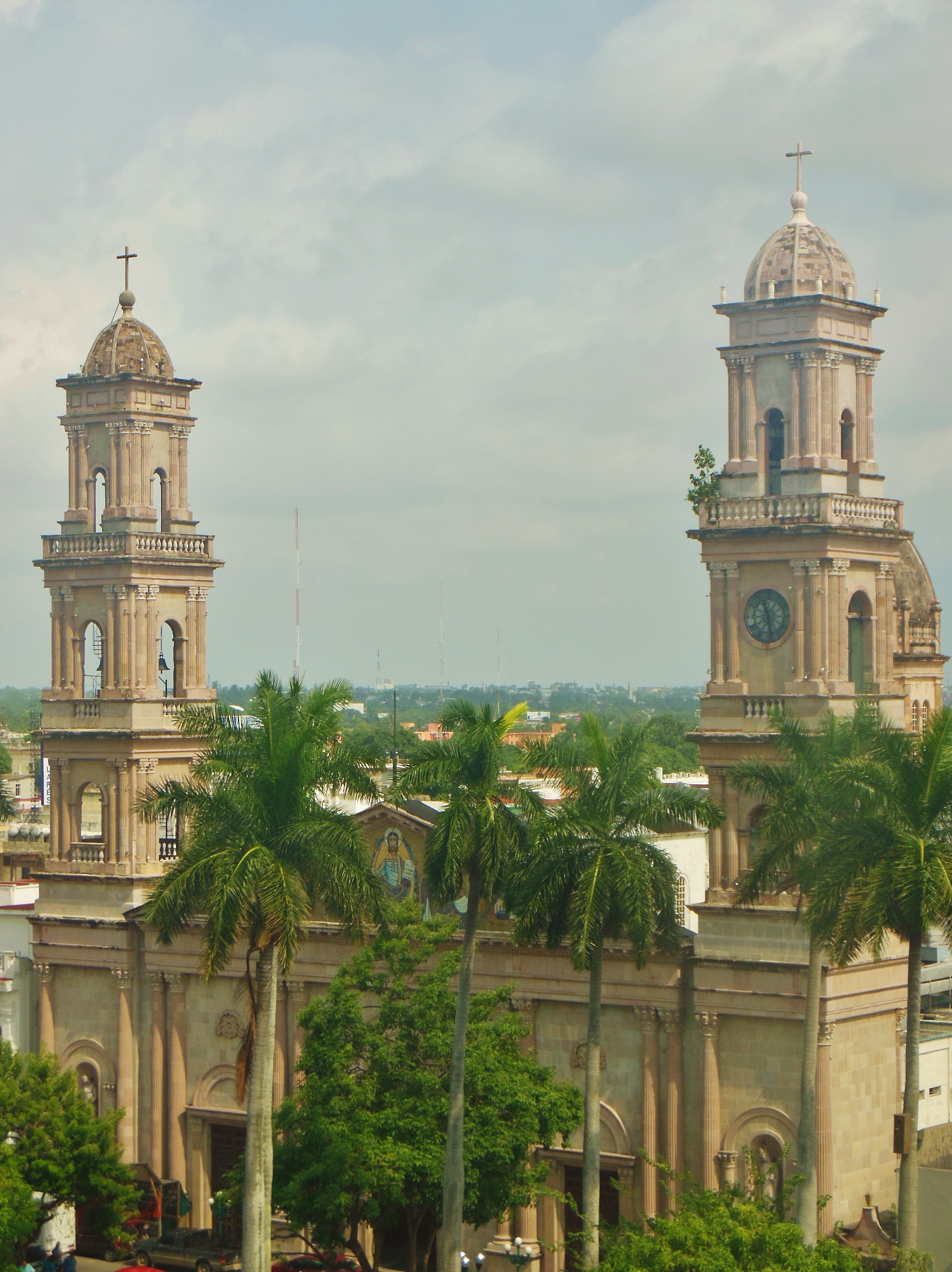
- Catedral de la Inmaculada Concepción

Location
- Country: Mexico
- Ecclesiastical province: Monterrey

Statistics
- Area: 8,756 sq mi (22,680 km^{2})
- Population: Total; Catholics: (as of 2010); 1,234,000; 1,150,000 (93.2%)
- Parishes: 64

Information
- Denomination: Catholic Church
- Sui iuris church: Latin Church
- Rite: Roman Rite
- Established: 13 August 1861 (164 years ago)
- Cathedral: Cathedral of the Immaculate Conception

Current leadership
- Pope: Leo XIV
- Bishop: Margarito Salazar Cárdenas
- Metropolitan Archbishop: Rogelio Cabrera López

Map
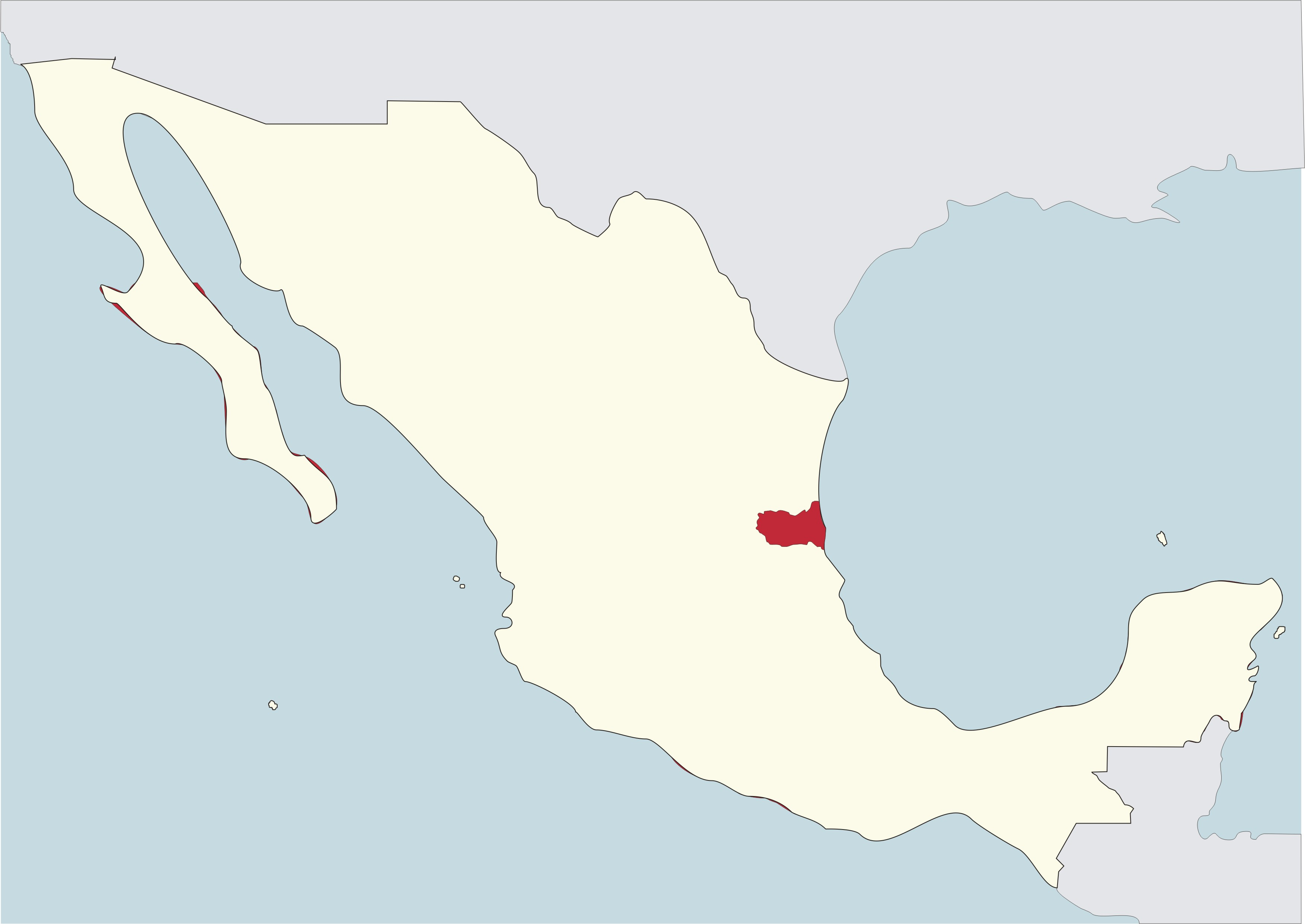

The Diocese of Tampico (Latin: Dioecesis Tampicensis) is a Latin Church ecclesiastical territory or diocese of the Catholic Church in Mexico It is a suffragan in the ecclesiastical province of the metropolitan Archdiocese of Monterrey. It was erected 12 March 1870 as the Diocese of Ciudad Victoria-Tamaulipas and renamed 25 February 1958. The original seat became the new Roman Catholic Diocese of Ciudad Victoria in 1964.

== Bishops ==
=== Ordinaries ===
- Francisco de la Concepción Ramírez y González, O.F.M. (1861–1869)
- Jose Maria Ignacio Montes de Oca y Obregón (1871–1879), appointed Bishop of Linares o Nueva León, Nuevo León
- Giuseppe Ignazio Eduardo Sánchez Camacho (1880–1896)
- Filemón Fierro y Terán (1897–1905)
- José de Jesús Guzmán y Sánchez (1909–1914)
- José Guadalupe Ortíz y López (1919–1923), appointed Bishop of Chilapa, Guerrero
- Serafín María Armora y González (1923–1955)
- Ernesto Corripio y Ahumada (1956–1967), appointed Archbishop of Antequera, Oaxaca; future Cardinal
- Arturo Antonio Szymanski Ramírez (1968–1987), appointed Bishop of San Luis Potosí
- Rafael Gallardo García, O.S.A. (1987–2003)
- José Luis Dibildox Martínez (2003–2018)
- José Armando Álvarez Cano (2019–2025)
- Margarito Salazar Cárdenas (since 2026)

=== Auxiliary bishop ===
- Ernesto Corripio y Ahumada (1952-1956), appointed Bishop here; future Cardinal

=== Other priest of this diocese who became bishop ===
- Roberto Yenny García, appointed Bishop of Ciudad Valles, San Luís Potosí In 2020

== Territorial losses ==
| Year | Along with | To form |
|---|---|---|
| 1922 | Diocese of Veracruz-Jalapa | Diocese of Papantla |
| 1958 | – | Diocese of Matamoros |
| 1962 | Diocese of Huejutla; Diocese of Papantla; Diocese of Tulancingo | Diocese of Tuxpan |
| 1964 | Diocese of Matamoros | Diocese of Ciudad Victoria |

== Episcopal See ==
- Tampico, Tamaulipas

== See also ==
- Immaculate Conception Cathedral, Tampico

== External links and references ==
- "Diocese of Tampico". Catholic-Hierarchy.
