= Rafael Gallardo García =

Mexican bishop (1927–2021)

Rafael Gallardo García OSA
- Bishop of Tampico
- Church: Catholic Church
- Diocese: Diocese of Tampico
- In office: 21 May 1987 – 27 December 2003
- Predecessor: Arturo Antonio Szymanski Ramírez
- Successor: José Luis Dibildox Martínez
- Previous post: Bishop of Linares (1974-1987)

Orders
- Ordination: 8 April 1950
- Consecration: 24 September 1974 by Alfonso Espino y Silva

Personal details
- Born: 28 October 1927 Yuriria, Guanajuato, Mexico
- Died: 30 January 2021 (aged 93) Tampico, Tamaulipas, Mexico

Rafael Gallardo García (28 October 1927 – 30 January 2021) was a Mexican Roman Catholic bishop.

Gallardo García was born in Yuriria and ordained to the priesthood in 1950. He served as bishop of the Roman Catholic Diocese of Linares, Mexico, from 1974 to 1987 and as bishop of the Roman Catholic Diocese of Tampico, Mexico, from 1987 to 2003.
