= Tampico Cathedral =

Immaculate Conception Cathedral
- Catedral de la Inmaculada Concepción
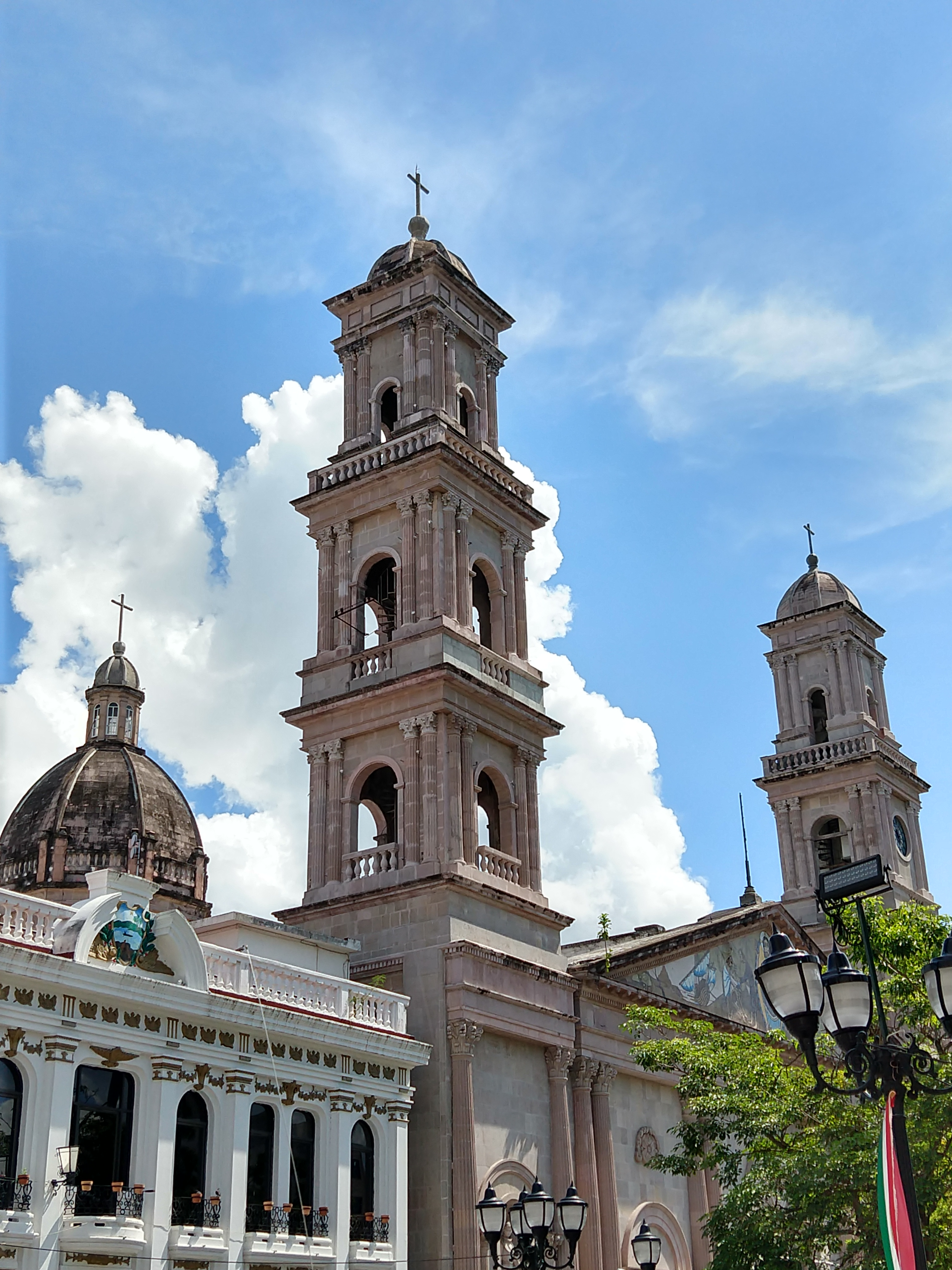
- Immaculate Conception Cathedral
- 22°12′59″N 97°51′27″W
- Location: Tampico
- Country: Mexico
- Denomination: Roman Catholic Church
- Sui iuris church: Latin Church

History
- Status: Active
- Founded: 1841
- Dedicated: Immaculate Conception
- Consecrated: November 12, 1931

Architecture
- Functional status: Cathedral
- Groundbreaking: May 9, 1841

The Immaculate Conception Cathedral (also Tampico Cathedral; Spanish: Catedral de la Inmaculada Concepción) is the main Catholic church in the Diocese of Tampico in Tampico, Tamaulipas, Mexico. It is located opposite the Plaza de Armas, in the historical center of the city.

The erection of the Cathedral of Tampico was not carried out until 1841; the first stone was placed on May 9. The original project was undertaken by architect Lorenzo de la Hidalga, who was in charge of the work in 1850. In 1917, the building suffered the collapse of its central nave, and in 1922, the west tower collapsed after being struck by lightning.

It was consecrated on November 12, 1931. It has three naves and a Latin cross plan.

== See also ==
- Roman Catholicism in Mexico
- Immaculate Conception Cathedral

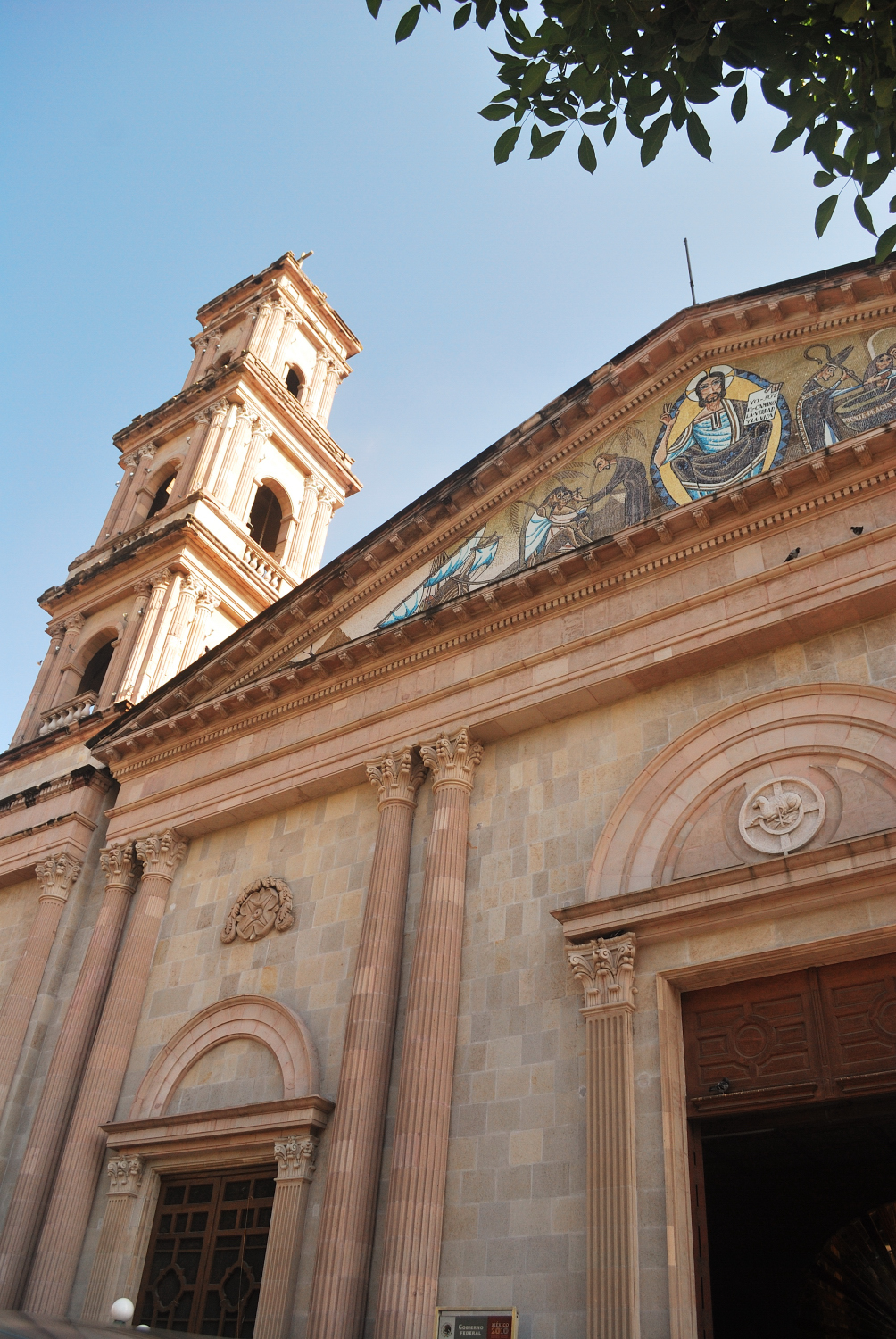
Another View
