= Diocese of Linares (Mexico) =

Latin Catholic jurisdiction in Mexico

Coordinates: 24.8592°N 99.5678°W

Diocese of Linares Dioecesis Linarina Diócesis de Linares
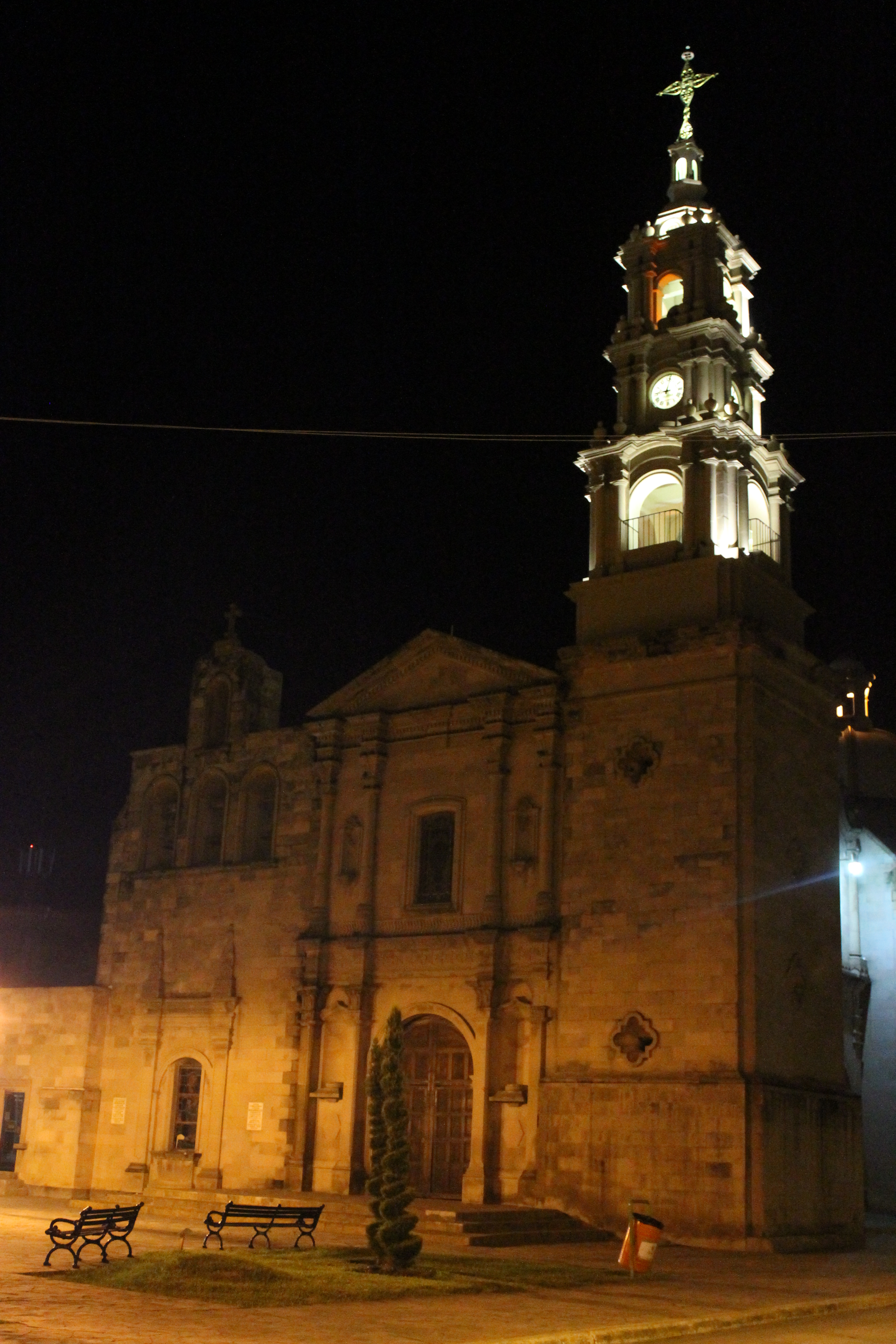
- Catedral de San Felipe Apóstol

Location
- Country: Mexico
- Ecclesiastical province: Province of Monterrey

Statistics
- Area: 12,921 sq mi (33,470 km^{2})
- Population: Total; Catholics: (as of 2004); 317,057; 269,141 (84.9%)
- Parishes: 21

Information
- Denomination: Catholic Church
- Sui iuris church: Latin Church
- Rite: Roman Rite
- Established: 30 April 1962 (63 years ago)
- Cathedral: Cathedral of St. Philip

Current leadership
- Pope: Leo XIV
- Bishop: vacant
- Metropolitan Archbishop: Rogelio Cabrera López
- Bishops emeritus: Ramón Calderón Batres

Website
- www.diocesisdelinares.com

The Diocese of Linares in Mexico (Latin: Dioecesis Linarina) is a Latin Church ecclesiastical territory or diocese of the Catholic Church in Mexico. The diocese is a suffragan in the ecclesiastical province of the metropolitan Archdiocese of Monterrey that was founded in 1777 with the name of Diocese of Linares (name changed in Monterrey in 1922). The new Diocese of Linares was erected on 30 April 1962. The cathedra is found in the Linares Cathedral in the episcopal see of Linares, Nuevo León.

== Bishops ==
- Anselmo Zarza Bernal (1962 -1966), appointed Bishop of León, Guanajuato
- Antonio Sahagún López (1966 -1973), resigned and was appointed Auxiliary Bishop of Guadalajara, Jalisco
- Rafael Gallardo García, O.S.A. (1974 -1987), appointed Bishop of Tampico, Tamaulipas
- Ramón Calderón Batres (1988 -2014)
- Hilario González García (2014 -2020), appointed Bishop of Saltillo, Coahuila

== External links and references ==
- "Diocese of Linares". Catholic-Hierarchy.
