= José Luis Dibildox Martínez =

Mexican Roman Catholic bishop (1943–2018)

- Bishop of Tampico
- Church: Catholic Church
- Diocese: Diocese of Tampico
- In office: 27 December 2003 – 20 July 2018
- Predecessor: Rafael Gallardo García
- Successor: José Armando Álvarez Cano
- Previous post: Bishop of Tarahumara (1993-2003)

Orders
- Ordination: 27 October 1968
- Consecration: 25 January 1994 by Girolamo Prigione

Personal details
- Born: 20 July 1943 Matehuala, San Luis Potosí, Mexico
- Died: 31 August 2018 (aged 75) Tampico, Tamaulipas, Mexico

José Luis Dibildox Martín (20 July 1943 – 31 August 2018) was a Mexican Roman Catholic bishop.

Dibildox Martín was born in Mexico and was ordained to the priesthood in 1968. He served as bishop of the Roman Catholic Diocese of Tarahumara, Mexico, from 1993 to 2003 and then as bishop of the Roman Catholic Diocese of Tampico, Mexico, from 2003 until he resigned in 2018.
