= Lorenzo de la Hidalga =

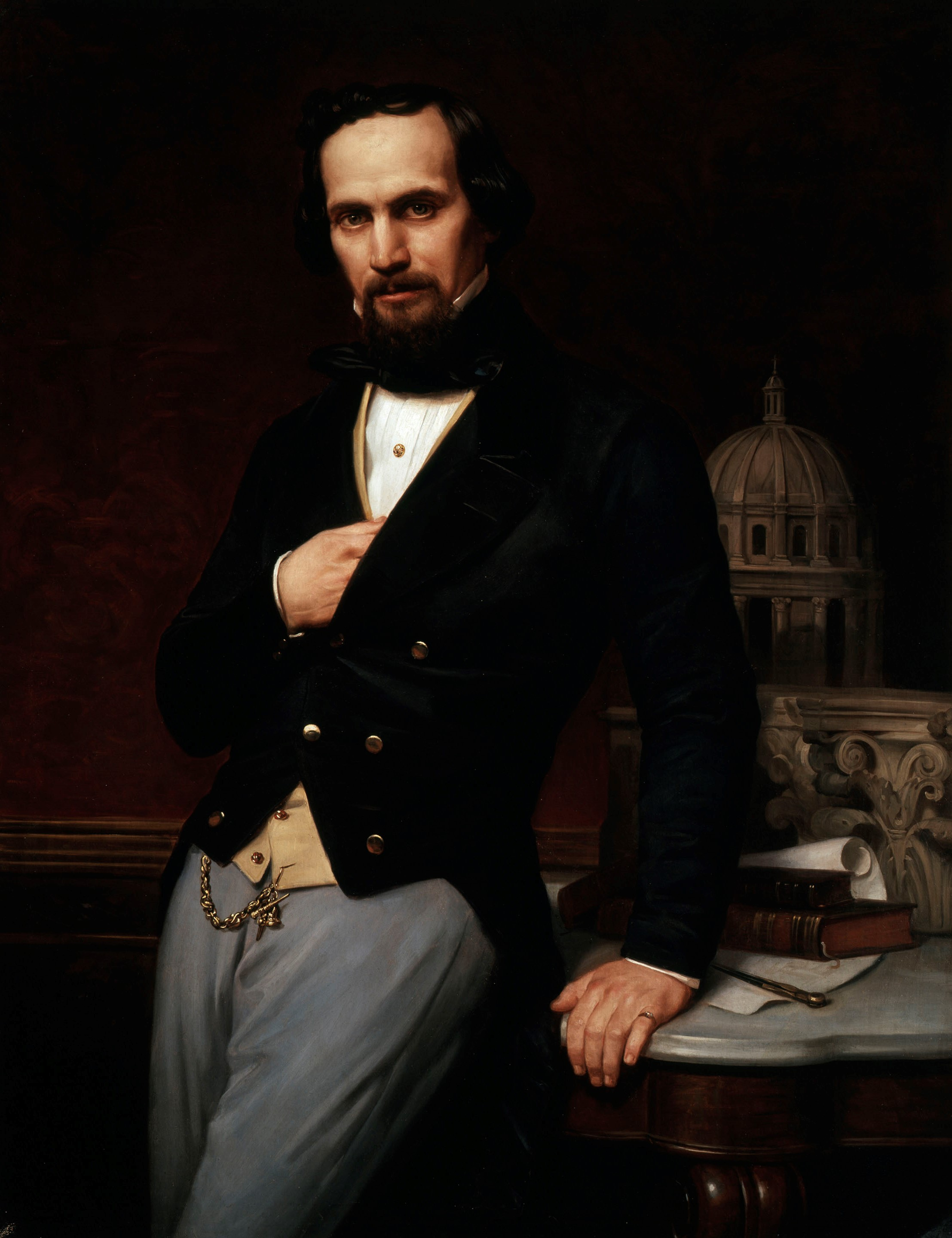
Lorenzo de la Hidalga; portrait by Pelegrí Clavé (1851)

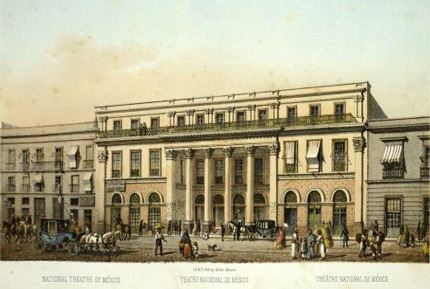
An early postcard of the Gran Teatro Nacional

Lorenzo de la Hidalga (4 July 1810 – 1872) was a Spanish architect who spent most of his career in Mexico. Few of his buildings have survived, due to earthquakes, urban redevelopment, and other factors.

== Biography ==
He was born in Vitoria-Gasteiz in 1810. While still rather young, he enrolled at the Academia de Bellas Artes de San Fernando in Madrid; graduating in 1836 with a degree in architecture. He then spent some time in Paris, where he was inspired by the Neo-Classical ideals that were prevalent at the time, as well as the latest concepts concerning structural function, and the works of contemporary architects.

Family circumstances took him to Mexico in 1838, where he married Ana García Icazbalceta, elder sister of the noted historian Joaquín García Icazbalceta. They settled in Mexico City; soon becoming a part of the intellectual and cultural circles there. He also performed construction work on several of her family's estates. He was honored by the Academia de San Carlos, although he chose not to teach there.

In terms of politics, he proved to be very adaptable, working for both President Santa Anna and Emperor Maximilian I. In the 1840s, during the time he worked for the president, he was commissioned by a businessman, Francisco Arbeu, to build the Gran Teatro Santa Anna, which, after several name changes, came to be known as the Gran Teatro Nacional.

In that same period, he built the market at the Plaza del Volador, and worked on a project to create a monument to the heroes of Mexican Independence, to be placed in the Plaza de la Constitución. The project was never completed. Later, during the short-lived Second Mexican Empire, he was named Arquitecto del Palacio y de la Iglesia Catedral, and worked on several more projects that were never brought to fruition, due to the unstable political situation. In 1872, he died in Mexico City.

His works have not fared well. The Gran Teatro Nacional was demolished in 1901 to extend and widen the Avenida Cinco del Mayo, and the Plaza de Volador was destroyed by a fire in 1870. The current Tampico Cathedral is a restoration. The central nave of his original structure collapsed in 1917, and one of its towers was destroyed by lightning in 1922. An aqueduct in Puebla survived until the earthquake of 2017. One of his few remaining original works is the cupola at Santa Teresa la Antigua, a former convent which is now an art center. It was a replacement for the original, which had been toppled by an earthquake in 1845.
