= 2024 in Mexico =

- Decades: 2000s; 2010s; 2020s
- See also: History of Mexico; List of years in Mexico; Timeline of Mexican history

This article lists events occurring in Mexico during 2024. The list also contains names of the incumbents at federal and state levels and cultural and entertainment activities of the year.

== Incumbents ==
President and cabinet
Office	Image	Name	Tenure / Current length
President		Andrés Manuel López Obrador	1 December 2018 (7 years ago) - 1 October 2024
President		Claudia Sheinbaum	1 October 2024
Secretariat of the Interior		Luisa María Alcalde Luján	19 June 2023 (3 years ago)
Secretariat of Foreign Affairs		Alicia Bárcena Ibarra	3 July 2023 (3 years ago)
Treasury		Rogelio Ramírez de la O	3 August 2021 (5 years ago)
Economy		Raquel Buenrostro Sánchez	7 October 2022 (4 years ago)
Environment		María Luisa Albores	2 September 2020 (6 years ago)
Tourism		Miguel Torruco Marqués	1 December 2018 (7 years ago)
Civil Service		Roberto Salcedo Aquino	21 June 2021 (5 years ago)
Health		Jorge Alcocer Varela	1 December 2018 (7 years ago)
Development		Román Meyer Falcón	1 December 2018 (7 years ago)
Welfare		Ariadna Montiel Reyes	11 January 2022 (4 years ago)
Culture		Alejandra Frausto Guerrero	1 December 2018 (7 years ago)
Defense		Luis Cresencio Sandoval	1 December 2018 (7 years ago)
Navy		José Rafael Ojeda Durán	1 December 2018 (7 years ago)
Security		Rosa Icela Rodríguez Velázquez	3 November 2020 (6 years ago)
Attorney General		Alejandro Gertz Manero	18 January 2019 (7 years ago)

=== Supreme Court ===
- President of the Supreme Court: Norma Lucía Piña Hernández

=== LXVI Legislature of the Mexican Congress ===
==== President of the Senate ====
- Ana Lilia Rivera

==== President of the Chamber of Deputies ====
- Marcela Guerra Castillo, Ifigenia Martínez, Sergio Gutiérrez Luna

== Events ==
=== January ===
- 19 January – José Alberto García Vilano, the leader of the Gulf Cartel, is arrested in Monterrey.
- 30 January:
  - A bus collides with a truck on a highway in Elota, Sinaloa, killing 19 people and injuring 18 others.
  - Four people are killed and 15 others are rescued after a boat capsizes while travelling between Cancún and Isla Mujeres, Quintana Roo.

=== February ===
- 5 February – Four taxi and bus drivers are killed during coordinated shootings in Chilpancingo.
- 26 February – Illegal loggers kill three forest rangers in the foothills of the Iztaccihuatl volcano in Puebla.
- 27 February – A tractor-trailer and a pick-up truck collide in San Luis Potosí, killing 10 people.

=== March ===
- 1 March – Four soldiers are killed by an improvised explosive device in a trap near Aguililla, Michoacán. The soldiers were inspecting a camp, likely used by cartel members, when they stepped on an anti-personnel mine set in the underbrush.
- 18 March – Three officers of the Michoacán Civil Guard are killed in an attack on a highway between Pátzcuaro and Uruapan.
- 27 March – At least four people are killed in wildfires across the State of Mexico.

=== April ===
- 5 April – After local police arrest former vice-president Jorge Glas at its embassy in Quito in violation of Article 22 of the Vienna Convention on Diplomatic Relations, Mexico suspends diplomatic relations with Ecuador.
- 8 April:
  - A total solar eclipse occurs over the states of Sinaloa, Coahuila, Durango, Chihuahua, Colima, and Nayarit, the first total solar eclipse visible from Mexico since 1991.
  - The headquarters of the state government of Guerrero in Chilpancingo is set on fire by demonstrators protesting the Iguala mass kidnapping.
- 27 April – Five people are found dead inside a house in Oaxaca after consuming a poisoned substance during a Santeria ritual.
- 28 April – Eighteen people are killed and 32 others are injured after a bus crashes on a highway in Malinalco, State of Mexico.

=== May ===
- 8 May – Rolling blackouts affect several cities in Mexico amidst an ongoing heatwave.
- 11 May – Eight people are killed in a mass shooting in Huitzilac, Morelos.
- 14 May – Eleven people are killed in two mass shootings in and around Chicomuselo, Chiapas.
- 15 May – El Califa de León, located in Colonia San Rafael, Mexico City, becomes the first Mexican taco stand to receive a Michelin star.
- 16 May – A mass shooting at a campaign rally in La Concordia, Chiapas, kills six people, including mayoral candidate Lucero López Maza, and injures two others.
- 22 May – San Pedro Garza García stage collapse: Nine people are killed and 121 others are injured in a stage collapse in San Pedro Garza Garcia, Nuevo León.
- 24 May – Dozens of people are killed across Mexico in a deadly heatwave, with temperatures as high as 45 °C (113 °F) recorded.
- 28 May – South Africa's genocide case against Israel: Mexico announces it will intervene in the genocide case on the side of South Africa.

=== June ===
- 2 June:
  - 2024 Mexican general election: Claudia Sheinbaum is elected as the first female president of Mexico. The ruling party Morena party wins a supermajority in the Chamber of Deputies but not in the Senate, falling short of the two-thirds majority needed to change the Constitution.
  - 2024 Mexican local elections
- 5 June:
  - US President Joe Biden institutes a broad asylum ban on migrants illegally crossing the Mexico–United States border, with actions to deport or turn people back to Mexico, with exceptions for unaccompanied children, people with serious medical or safety threats, and victims of trafficking.
  - The World Health Organization confirms the first human fatality from the H5N2 avian influenza virus following the death of a 59-year-old man in Mexico City in April.
- 7 June – RICH nightclub railing collapse: A third-story railing outside of the RICH nightclub in San Luis Potosí collapses, causing several young concertgoers to a Kevin Moreno concert to fall over 12 meters (39.4 feet), killing two and injuring 15.
- 8–9 June – Around 4,200 people are displaced after armed gangs attack the town of Tila in Chiapas.
- 9 June – Nine people are injured in an explosion in Acapulco.
- 12 June – The American Civil Liberties Union files a lawsuit in federal court against the Biden administration for US President Joe Biden's new presidential directive which limits migrants seeking asylum at the Mexico–United States border.
- 17 June – Salvador Villalva Flores, the newly elected mayor of Copala, Guerrero, is shot dead aboard a bus in San Pedro las Playas.
- 18 June – The United States Department of Agriculture announces a temporary pause to any new imports of mangoes and avocados from Michoacán after an incident that reportedly causes security concerns for its safety inspectors on the ground.
- 20 June:
  - Three people are reported dead in Nuevo León due to Tropical Storm Alberto.
  - Two people are killed during protests against suspected water contamination by a pork processing plant in San Antonio Limón, Veracruz.
- 21 June – United States Secretary of the Treasury Janet Yellen announces sanctions against eight members of La Nueva Familia Michoacana Organization.

=== July ===
- 1 July – The bodies of 19 people are found in the vicinity of an abandoned dump truck in La Concordia, Chiapas.
- 5 July – Hurricane Beryl makes landfall on the Yucatán Peninsula after killing twelve people in the Caribbean.
- 8 July – Minerva Pérez, the head of the fishing industry chamber of Baja California, is shot dead by unidentified gunmen in Ensenada.
- 13 to 21 July – 2024 FIBA Under-17 Women's Basketball World Cup
- 17 July – Six members of two families are shot dead by unidentified gunmen in Yuriria, Guanajuato.
- 23 July – Six people are killed in an explosion at a tequila factory owned by Jose Cuervo in Tequila, Jalisco.
- 24 July – Guatemalan authorities announce the arrival of 600 refugees from Mexico fleeing drug-related violence in Chiapas.
- 25 July – Sinaloa Cartel co-founder Ismael "El Mayo" Zambada is arrested along with Joaquín Guzmán López, the son of imprisoned cartel co-founder Joaquín "El Chapo" Guzmán, by US authorities in El Paso, Texas.

=== August ===
- 2 August:
  - Four men, including a police officer, are found shot to death near Cancún, Quintana Roo.
  - The Mexican Army confirms the first deaths of its personnel in drone strikes launched by drug cartels in Michoacán.
- 4 August – Journalist Alejandro Martínez is shot dead in Celaya.
- 20 August –2024 Mexican judicial reform: Workers in federal courts nationwide go on strike in protest over plans by President López Obrador to have judges elected to office and reduce merit qualifications for judicial employees.
- 21 August – Eleven gunmen working for the Los Zetas cartel are convicted and sentenced to up to 50 years' imprisonment for the killing of 122 people in the 2011 San Fernando massacre.
- 27 August – Mexico suspends all interactions with the Canadian and U.S. embassies in Mexico City due to claimed interference with its independence and internal affairs after both ambassadors criticized planned reforms in the judiciary.
- 28 August – Senators Araceli Saucedo and José Sabino Herrera, elected for the defunct Party of the Democratic Revolution (PRD), defect to the ruling Morena party, leaving Morena and its allies one seat short of a supermajority in both chambers of Congress.
- 29 August – Three people are killed and 17 are injured after a car crashes into a group of migrants in Oaxaca.

=== September ===
- 10 September – Protesters demonstrating against the 2024 Mexican judicial reform storm the Senate building.
- 15 September – President López Obrador signs the 2024 Mexican judicial reform into law, making Mexico the only country to have its judges elected by popular vote.
- 17 September – Six people are killed in a landslide caused by heavy rains in Naucalpan.
- 20 September – Rubén Oseguera González, the son of Jalisco New Generation Cartel leader Nemesio Oseguera Cervantes, is convicted by a US federal jury of various drug-related charges and the downing of a Mexican military helicopter in 2015.
- 22 September – Infighting in the Sinaloa Cartel – At least 70 people are killed following weeks of clashes between factions of the Sinaloa Cartel in Sinaloa.
- 23 September – Hurricane John makes landfall near Marquelia, Guerrero, as a Category 3 hurricane, killing at least three people.
- 25 September – President-elect Claudia Sheinbaum officially bans King Felipe VI of Spain from attending her inauguration on 1 October, citing his failure to apologize for the Spanish conquest in the 1500s. In response, the Spanish government says that it would boycott the event altogether.
- 27 September –
  - Hurricane John makes a second landfall near Tizupan, Michoacán, this time as a tropical storm, killing a total of 17 people.
  - Twenty-four surveillance cameras used by drug cartels are discovered attached to public installations in San Luis Río Colorado, Sonora.
- 28 September – Mexico wins the 2024 Homeless World Cup competition in Seoul, South Korea, after defeating Romania 5–2 in the women's final and England 6–5 in the men's final.
- 30 September – The government orders a ban on the sale of junk food in schools by April 2025.

=== October ===
- 1 October –
  - Claudia Sheinbaum is sworn in as the 66th President of Mexico. She becomes the first president to be inaugurated on that date since a change in the electoral law in 2014 moved the date from 1 December.
  - A truck carrying migrants is fired upon by soldiers near Huixtla, Chiapas, killing six passengers and injuring ten others.
  - Four people are killed and two others are injured in an attack by unidentified gunmen on a drug rehabilitation center in Salamanca, Guanajuato.
- 2 October – President Sheinbaum issues an official apology for the killing of student protesters by soldiers in the Tlatelolco massacre in 1968.
- 3 October – Twelve people are killed in a series of attacks by suspected drug cartels in Salamanca, Guanajuato.
- 6 October – Alejandro Arcos, the mayor of Chilpancingo, is assassinated less than a week after taking office.
- 13 October – Five decapitated bodies are found along a road in Ojuelos, Jalisco.
- 16 October – A US federal court sentences Genaro García Luna, the former Secretary of Public Security under President Felipe Calderón, to 38 years' imprisonment for colluding with the Sinaloa Cartel in smuggling illegal drugs into the United States.
- 17 October – Unidentified gunmen open fire on the offices of the newspaper El Debate in Culiacán.
- 20 October – Marcelo Pérez Pérez, a Catholic priest and indigenous rights activist working in Chiapas, is shot dead after celebrating Sunday mass in San Cristóbal de las Casas.
- 21 October – Nineteen suspected gang members are killed in a shootout with soldiers outside Culiacán that leads to the arrest of a local leader of the Sinaloa Cartel.
- 24 October –
  - Sixteen people, including two responding police officers, are killed in a shootout between rival drug cartels in Guerrero.
  - Three police officers are injured in a car bombing in Acámbaro, Guanajuato.
- 25 October – A bus overturns after colliding with a trailer that had been detached from a truck in Zacatecas, killing 24 people and injuring five others.
- 26 October – At least 16 pedestrians are injured in a car ramming in the cathedral square of Guadalajara by a suspect driving a stolen pickup who is arrested.
- 30 October –
  - Eight of the 11 justices of the Supreme Court of Justice of the Nation, including its president Norma Lucía Piña Hernández, submit their resignations from the court.
  - Twelve people are killed in an explosion and fire at a steel factory in Xaloztoc, Tlaxcala.
  - The Mexican Tennis Federation cancels its Juniors 30 tournament in Irapuato, Guanajuato, after ten underage players and a coach are targeted by a virtual kidnapping scheme.

=== November ===
- 1 November – A constitutional amendment banning judicial reviews to any constitutional revision passed by two-thirds majorities in Congress and two-thirds of state legislatures comes into effect.
- 2 November – Two Colombian migrants are shot dead by the National Guard near Tecate.
- 5 November – The Supreme Court of Justice of the Nation rejects a petition to limit the scope of constitutional amendments regarding the election of judges to cover only justices of the Supreme Court.
- 7 November – Eleven people are found dead inside a pickup truck in Chilpancingo, while four others are found dead in a car in Acapulco.
- 9 November –
  - A rear admiral in the Mexican Navy is shot dead by unidentified gunmen in Manzanillo, Colima.
  - Ten people are killed while 13 others are injured in a shooting by unidentified gunmen at a bar in Querétaro.
- 16 November – The Miss Universe 2024 pageant is held at the Mexico City Arena.
- 22 November – The police chief of Texcaltitlán, State of Mexico, dies from suicide amid an attempt to arrest him on corruption charges. The mayor and police chief of Amanalco and the police chief of Tejupilco are also arrested on similar charges.
- 24 November – Six people are killed and five others are injured in a shooting at a bar in Villahermosa.
- 30 November – Eight people are killed and two others are injured in a shooting at a food stall in Apaseo el Grande, Guanajuato.

=== December ===
- 8 December – An unsuccessful hijacking is made on a domestic Volaris passenger aircraft flying from León to Tijuana, forcing its diversion to Guadalajara, where a passenger is arrested on suspicion of plotting to divert the aircraft to the United States.
- 9 December – Benito Aguas Atlahua, a federal deputy from the Ecologist Green Party, is shot dead by unknown gunmen in Zongolica, Veracruz.
- 10 December – Authorities announce the deaths of 17 children who were confined in various healthcare facilities in Michoacán, Guanajuato and the State of Mexico from blood infection caused by drug-resistant Klebsiella oxytoca bacteria believed to have been present in contaminated IV feeding bags.
- 11 December – Edmundo Román Pinzón, a judge in a state appeals court in Guerrero, is shot dead by unknown gunmen in Acapulco.
- 15 December – Jesús Franco Lárraga, the mayor of Tancanhuitz de Santos, San Luis Potosí, is shot dead along with three others by unknown gunmen in a highway ambush.
- 16 December –
  - Four police officers are killed in an attack on a patrol near Uriangato, Guanajuato.
  - Two soldiers are killed in a landmine explosion in Michoacán blamed on the La Resistencia cartel.
- 18 December – Two soldiers are killed in a landmine explosion in Michoacán blamed on drug cartels.
- 19 December – Seven inmates are killed in a prison riot in Villahermosa.
- 26 December – The skeletal remains of 12 people are recovered from a clandestine grave site in Ascensión, Chihuahua.
- 27 December – A bus and a truck collide near Xalapa, killing eight people and injuring 27 others.
- 29 December – The bodies of 15 people are recovered from clandestine grave sites in La Concordia, Chiapas.

== Art and entertainment ==
- List of Mexican films of 2024
- List of 2024 box office number-one films in Mexico
- List of Mexican submissions for the Academy Award for Best International Feature Film

== Deaths ==
=== January ===
- 4 January – Rosie Reyes, 84, Olympic tennis player (1968).
- 5 January –
  - Jorge Aguilar Mora, 77, poet and writer, winner of Xavier Villaurrutia Award (2015).
  - Carlos Bremer, 63, businessman and philanthropist.
- 6 January – Amparo Rubín, singer and lyricist.
- 8 January –
  - Adan Canto, 42, actor (Designated Survivor, The Cleaning Lady).
  - Héctor Murguía Lardizábal, 70, politician, deputy (1994–2012) and mayor of Ciudad Juárez (2004–2007, 2010–2013).
- 9 January – Aronia Wilson Tambo, 64, politician, murder.
- 10 January – Sergio García Ramírez, 85, jurist and politician, attorney general (1982–1988) and secretary of labor and social welfare (1981–1982), president of the Inter-American Court of Human Rights (2004–2007).
- 11 January – Agustín Téllez Cruces, 105, politician, interim governor of Guanajuato (1984–1985), justice (1974–1982) and president (1977–1982) of the Supreme Court of Justice of the Nation.
- 13 January – Ernesto Martens, 90, chemical engineer, secretary of energy (2000–2003).
- 16 January – José Agustín, 79, novelist (La tumba, De perfil, Ciudades desiertas), short-story writer, and essayist.
- 17 January – Carlos Rojas Gutiérrez, 69, politician and engineer, senator (2000–2006) and secretary of social development (1993–1998).
- 21 January – Jesús Federico Reyes Heroles, 71, politician, secretary of energy (1995–1997) and ambassador to the United States (1997–2000).
- 29 January – Héctor Sanabria, 78, football player (UNAM Pumas, national team) and manager (Toluca).

=== February ===
- 2 February –
  - Francisco Jara, 82, footballer (Guadalajara, national team).
  - Luis Morales Reyes, 87, Roman Catholic prelate, bishop of Tacámbaro (1979–1985) and Torreón (1990–1999) and archbishop of San Luis Potosí (1999–2012).
- 3 February – Helena Rojo, 79, actress (The House in the South, The Great Adventure of Zorro, Misterio) and model.
- 5 February – Horacio Sánchez Unzueta, 74, politician, lawyer and ambassador, governor of San Luis Potosí (1993–1997) and deputy (1991–1992).
- 9 February – Renata Flores, 74, actress (Rosa salvaje, La usurpadora, Amores verdaderos) and rock singer.
- 14 February –
  - Diego Chávez, 28, footballer (Veracruz, Mannucci).
  - Sasha Montenegro, 78, actress (Rina, Una mujer marcada, Las vías del amor).
- 19 February – Carlos Manuel Urzúa Macías, 68, economist, secretary of finance and public credit (2018–2019).

=== April ===
- 10 April – Thelma Dorantes, 76, telenovela actress
- 20 April – Lourdes Portillo, 80, filmmaker (The Devil Never Sleeps) and activist.

=== June ===
- 14 June – Nancy MacKenzie, 81, actress (The Simpsons).

=== October ===
- 5 October – Ifigenia Martínez y Hernández, 94, politician and diplomat, senator (1988–1991, 2018–2024), president (since 2024) and four-time member of the Chamber of Deputies.

=== November ===
- 28 November – Silvia Pinal, 93, actress (Viridiana, The Exterminating Angel).

=== December ===
- 25 December – Dulce, 69, actress and singer.

== See also ==
- Outline of Mexico
- History of Mexico
