= 2022 in Mexico =

- Decades: 2000s; 2010s; 2020s
- See also: History of Mexico; List of years in Mexico; Timeline of Mexican history

This article lists events occurring in Mexico during the year 2022. The article lists the most important political leaders during the year at both federal and state levels and will include a brief year-end summary of major social and economic issues. Cultural events, including major sporting events, are also listed.

== Incumbents ==
=== President and cabinet ===
- President: Andrés Manuel López Obrador MORENA
- Interior: Adán Augusto López
- Foreign Affairs: Marcelo Ebrard
- Treasury: Rogelio Ramírez de la O
- Economy: Tatiana Clouthier Carrillo
- Environment: Maria Luisa Albores
- Tourism: Miguel Torruco Marqués
- Civil Service: Irma Sandoval-Ballesteros
- Health: Jorge Alcocer Varela
- Development: Román Meyer Falcón
- Welfare: Javier May Rodríguez
- Culture: Alejandra Frausto Guerrero
- Defense: Luis Cresencio Sandoval
- Navy: José Rafael Ojeda Durán
- Security: Rosa Icela Rodríguez
- Attorney General: Alejandro Gertz Manero

=== Supreme Court ===
- President of the Supreme Court: Arturo Zaldívar Lelo de Larrea

=== Governors ===
- Aguascalientes: Martín Orozco Sandoval PAN
- Baja California: Marina del Pilar Ávila Olmeda MORENA
- Baja California Sur: Víctor Manuel Castro Cosío MORENA
- Campeche: Layda Elena Sansores MORENA
- Chiapas: Rutilio Escandón MORENA
- Chihuahua: Javier Corral Jurado PAN
- Coahuila: Miguel Ángel Riquelme Solís PRI
- Colima: Indira Vizcaíno Silva MORENA
- Durango: José Rosas Aispuro PAN
- Guanajuato: Diego Sinhué Rodríguez Vallejo PAN
- Guerrero: Evelyn Salgado Pineda MORENA
- Hidalgo: Omar Fayad PRI
- Jalisco: Enrique Alfaro Ramírez MC
- Mexico City: Claudia Sheinbaum MORENA
- México (state): Alfredo del Mazo Maza PRI
- Michoacán: Alfredo Ramírez Bedolla MORENA
- Morelos: Cuauhtémoc Blanco PES
- Nayarit: Miguel Ángel Navarro Quintero MORENA
- Nuevo León: Samuel García Sepúlveda, MC
- Oaxaca: Alejandro Murat Hinojosa PRI
- Puebla: Miguel Barbosa Huerta until december 13, Sergio Salomón Céspedes since december 15 MORENA
- Querétaro: Mauricio Kuri González PAN
- Quintana Roo: Carlos Joaquín González PRD
- San Luis Potosí: Ricardo Gallardo Cardona PVEM
- Sinaloa: Rubén Rocha Moya MORENA
- Sonora: Alfonso Durazo Montaño MORENA
- Tabasco: Carlos Manuel Merino Campos MORENA
- Tamaulipas: Francisco Javier García Cabeza de Vaca PAN
- Tlaxcala: Lorena Cuellar Cisneros MORENA
- Veracruz: Cuitláhuac García Jiménez MORENA
- Yucatán: Mauricio Vila Dosal PAN
- Zacatecas: David Monreal Ávila MORENA

=== LXV Legislature ===
==== President of the Senate ====
- Olga Sánchez Cordero MORENA

==== President of the Chamber of Deputies ====
- Sergio Gutiérrez Luna MORENA

== Events ==
Ongoing — COVID-19 pandemic in Mexico

=== January–March ===
- 2 March – Mexico voted on a United Nations resolution condemning Russia for its invasion of Ukraine.
- 5 March - Querétaro–Atlas riot
- 27 March - Las Tinajas massacre

=== April–June ===
- 10 April - 2022 Mexican presidential recall referendum
- 26 April - Mexico transited to the endemic phase.
- 23 May - Celaya massacre
- 5 June - 2022 Mexican local elections
- 16 June - FIFA makes its final selection for the sixteen venues to host matches during the 2026 World Cup, and three Mexican venus are selected: Estadio Azteca in Mexico City, Estadio BBVA in Monterrey, and Estadio Akron in Guadalajara.

=== July–September ===
- 19 September - 2022 Western Mexico earthquake

== Sports ==
Association football

- 2021–22 Liga MX season
- 2021–22 Liga MX Femenil season

Motorsport

- 2022 Mexico City ePrix
- 2022 NACAM Formula 4 Championship

Tennis

- 2022 Abierto Mexicano Telcel
- 2022 Abierto Zapopan
- 2022 Guanajuato Open
- 2022 Monterrey Challenger
- 2022 Monterrey Open

Other sports

- Mexico at the 2022 Winter Olympics
- Mexico at the 2022 Winter Paralympics
- 2022 LFA season
- 2022 Pan Am Badminton Championships

== Deaths ==
=== January ===
- 15 January – María Cristina Sangri Aguilar, politician (born 1941).
- 21 January – Adolfo Lugo Verduzco, politician (born 1933).
- 23 January – Lourdes Maldonado López, journalist (born 1954).
- 27 January
  - Ruy Pérez Tamayo, medical pathologist, immunologist (born 1924).
  - Diego Verdaguer, singer (born 1951).
- 31 January – Onésimo Cepeda Silva, Roman Catholic prelate (born 1937).

=== February ===
- 2 February – Alberto Baillères, billionaire businessman (born 1931).
- 3 February – Francisco Raúl Villalobos Padilla, Roman Catholic prelate (born 1921).
- 5 February – Rubén Fuentes, violinist and composer (born 1926).
- 9 February – Super Muñeco, professional wrestler (born 1962).
- 12 February – Héctor Pulido, footballer (born 1942).
- 19 February – Xavier Marc, actor, film director and cinematographer (born 1948).
- 21 February
  - Eduardo González Pálmer, footballer (born 1934).
  - Celeste Sánchez Romero, politician (born 1990).
- 22 February – José Isidro Guerrero Macías, Roman Catholic prelate (born 1951).

=== March ===
- 2 March – Israel Beltrán Montes, businessman and politician (born 1947).
- 4 March – Juan Carlos Muñiz, journalist (born 1984).
- 7 March – Jesús Zúñiga, farmer and politician (born 1947).
- 8 March – Tomás Boy, footballer and manager (born 1951).
- 14 March – Francisco Solís Peón, politician (born 1968).
- 17 March – Martha Palafox Gutiérrez, politician (born 1949).
- 28 March – Raquel Pankowsky, actress (born 1952).

=== April ===
- 4 April – Raziel, professional wrestler (born 1972).

=== June ===
- 23 June – Yrma Lydya, singer (born 1999).

=== July ===
- 8 July - Luis Echeverría, politician (born 1922), President of the Republic in 1970–1976
