= Roberto Sneider =

Mexican writer, director and producer

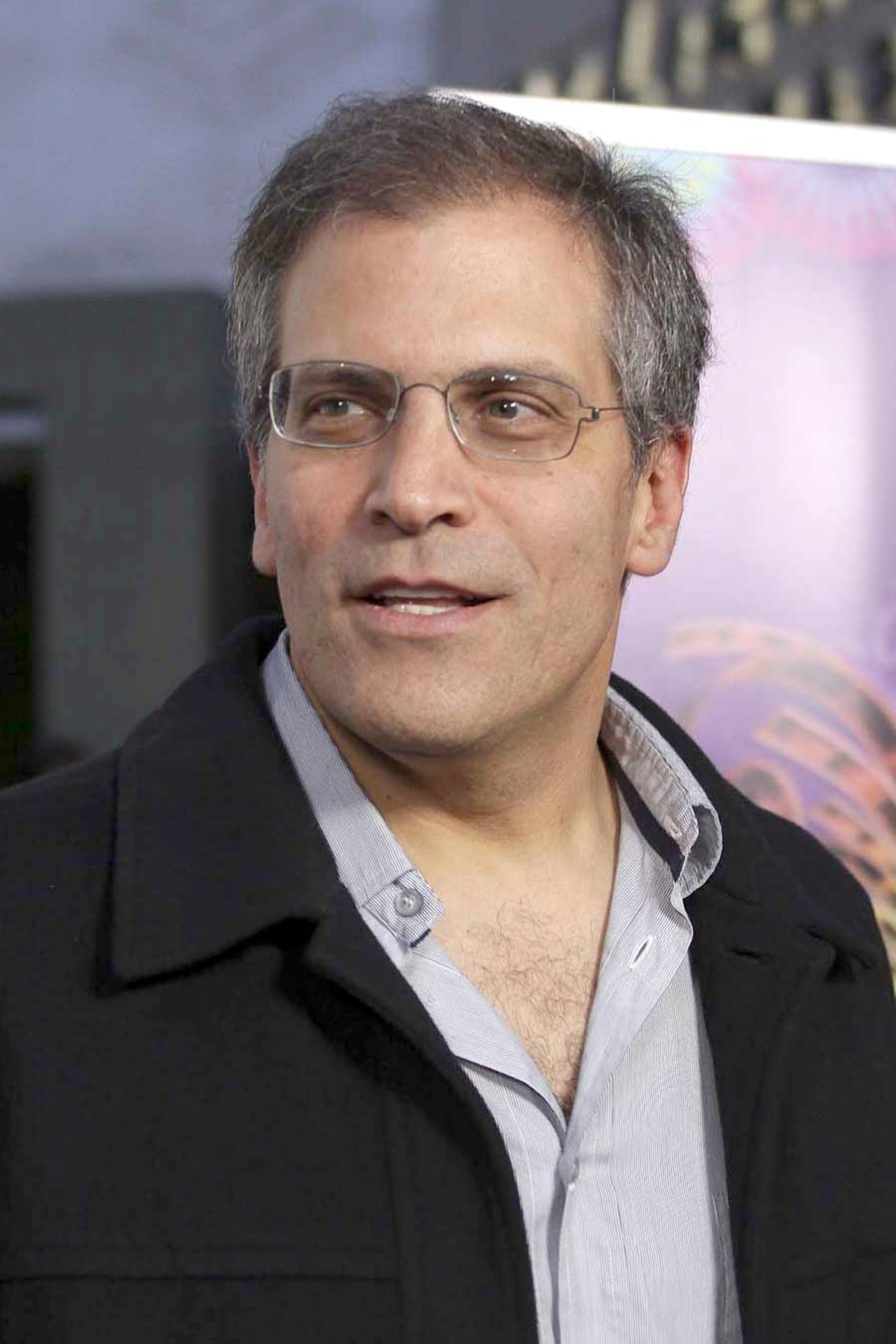
- Born: Roberto Sneider; Mexico City, Mexico
- Occupations: Film director, screenwriter, producer
- Years active: 1983–present
- Notable work: Two Crimes; Tear This Heart Out

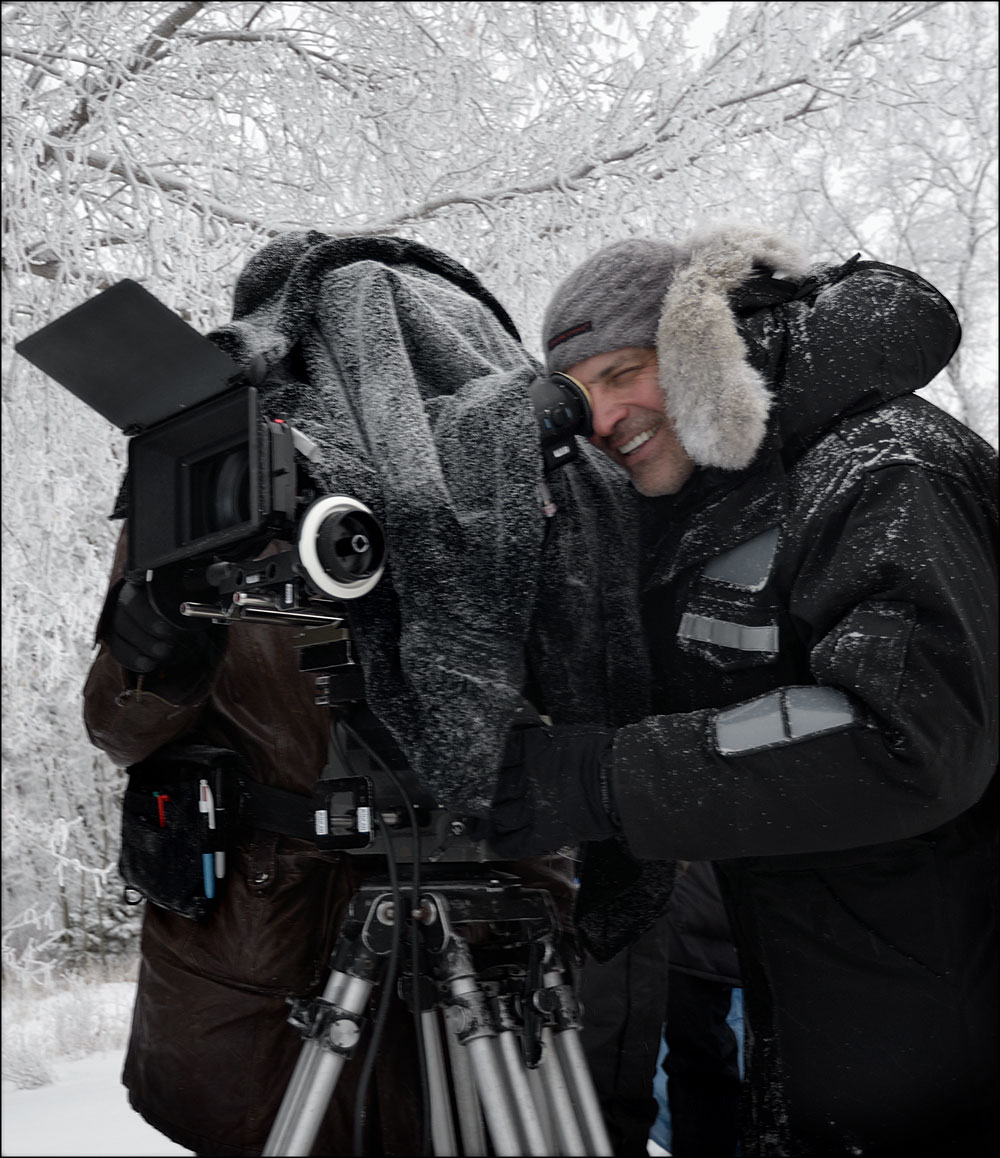
Roberto Sneider during the filming of Me estas matando Susana

Roberto Sneider is a Mexican writer, director and producer best known for his films Dos Crímenes and Tear This Heart Out.

== Early life and education ==
Sneider is a graduate of Universidad Iberoamericana and of the directing program at The American Film Institute.

== Career ==
Sneider started his career working in many different aspects of production, including being a Location Manager, Production Manager, and assistant director. His credits include films such as Havana (Sidney Pollack), Gringo Viejo (Luis Puenzo), Blood In, Blood Out (Taylor Hackford) and Mi Vida Loca (Allison Anders).

Dos Crímenes is Sneider's first feature film as writer, producer and director. It obtained more than fifteen international awards including the Montgolfier d'Or at the Three Continents Festival (Nantes, France), Cinedecouvertes Award, (Belgium), International Critics' Award (FIPRESCI) and three Mexican Academy awards. Based on the novel of the same title by Jorge Ibargüengoitia, it tells the story of Marcos who after being falsely accused of a murder, runs away to the small and quiet town of Cuevano, where he has relatives. There he finds that family matters are more complicated than he expected, and that the complexities of small-town life are richer (and more dangerous) than his apparently sophisticated life in the big city. Starring Damián Alcázar it became the most successful Mexican film of the year at the box office.

In 1999, Sneider created “La Banda Films”, a commercials production company. La Banda Films has produced hundreds of commercials and won a number of prestigious and international awards for its TV commercial work. These honors include a Cannes Lions for Axe Body Spray and the International TV Advertising Grand Award at the New York Festival, which shortlists the 10 best commercials of the year to be showcased at the MOMA.

As a commercials director, Sneider has won numerous awards, including the Best of Show at the New York Festival and the AICP Show.

Sneider produced and directed “Arráncame la Vida”, a period drama based on the novel of the same name by Ángeles Mastretta. With critically acclaimed performances by Ana Claudia Talancón and Daniel Giménez Cacho, it was Mexico's official submission for the 2009 Academy Award for Best Foreign Language Film and is one of the highest grossing Mexican films ever. It won three Mexican Academy awards.

Sneider was a producer on Frida, based on Hayden Herrera's biography of Mexican artist Frida Kahlo, which received six Academy Award nominations, winning two of them. He was a producer on Aquí Entre Nos (winner of the Bronce Zenith at Montreal International Film Festival), on the feature-length documentary Journey of dreams, and on The Hours with You (winner of the FIPRESCI award in Guadalajara).

Sneider is the director, producer and screenwriter of You're Killing Me Susana based on the novel Ciudades Desiertas by José Agustín and starring Gael García Bernal, Verónica Echegui and Ashley Hinshaw.
