= Victor Hernandez =

Victor Hernandez may refer to:

- Victor Hernández Cruz (born 1949), New York poet
- Víctor Hugo Hernández (born 1986), Mexican footballer
- Victor Hernández Stumpfhauser, Mexican composer
