= You're Killing Me Susana =

- Directed by: Roberto Sneider
- Starring: Gael García Bernal; Verónica Echegui
- Music by: Victor Hernandez Stumpfhauser
- Production company: Buffalo Gal Pictures
- Distributed by: Videocine
- Release date: 19 August 2016
- Running time: 100 minutes
- Country: Mexico
- Language: Spanish

You're Killing Me Susana (Spanish: Me estás matando, Susana) is a 2016 Mexican romantic comedy-drama film directed by Roberto Sneider. The film tells about the self-assured handsome Eligio, who is trying to get his wife back, who for some reason always leaves him, when he thinks everything is fine.

The film is based on the 1982 novel Ciudades desiertas by Mexican writer José Agustín.

== Cast ==
- Gael García Bernal – Eligio
- Verónica Echegui – Susana
- Ashley Hinshaw – Irene
- Jadyn Wong – Altagracia
- Björn Hlynur Haraldsson – Slawomir
- Adam Hurtig – Bryan
- Daniel Giménez Cacho – Editor
