= 2024 North America heat waves =

Meteorological history
- Duration: 17 March - 27 September 2024
- Heat event
- Max temp: 53.9 °C (129.0 °F), recorded at Furnace Creek, Death Valley, California on 7 July 2024

Overall effects
- Fatalities: 1161+ total 1006+ (United States); 155+ (Mexico)
- Areas affected: Mexico, United States, Central America

Beginning in March 2024, severe heat waves impacted Mexico, the Southern and Western United States, and Central America, leading to dozens of broken temperature records, mass deaths of animals from several threatened species, water shortages requiring rationing, increased forest fires, and over 155 deaths in Mexico with 2,567 people suffering from heat-related ailments. Another 1,006 people were killed in the United States.

== Mexico ==
The hot season in Mexico began on 17 March 2024. In May 2024, a heat dome formed over the Southern Gulf of Mexico and over Mexico, which led to record high temperatures being recorded in 10 cities in Mexico. Mexico City recorded a record high temperature of 34.7 °C (94.5 °F) on 25 May 2024. San Juan Bautista Valle Nacional recorded a temperature of 48 °C (118 °F) on 26 May 2024, the highest recorded temperature in the state of Oaxaca. The persistently high temperatures combined with seasonally lighter rainfall in the area led to increased risks of future water shortages, as well as power blackouts in part due to lowered water levels leading to decreased energy production from hydroelectric dams. At least 155 deaths due to heat were reported, with 2,567 people suffering from heat-related ailments including heat stroke and dehydration.

At least 157 howler monkeys in the states of Tabasco and Chiapas died due to the prolonged excessive heat and resulting dehydration. At least 100 parrots, toucans, bats, and other animals housed in the Selva Teenek eco-park in the state of San Luis Potosí also succumbed to dehydration.

According to preliminary data published by Servicio Meteorológico Nacional, on 20 June 2024, the town of Tepache, Sonora, tied the record for the highest temperature measured in the country since the registers began, achieving 52 °C (125.6 °F), and tying the previous record set in 1995 on Mexicali, Baja California.

== United States ==
Southern Texas was struck with a heatwave starting on May 25 2024, leading to numerous record breaking high temperatures recorded on 26 May 2024 in Del Rio at 112 °F (44 °C), Brownsville at 98 °F (37 °C) tied with the prior record set in 1928, and McAllen at 103 °F (39 °C).

On June 18, excessive heat caused rail delays on trains in New Jersey and New York City. On June 19, Caribou, Maine tied their all time highest temperature at 96 °F (36 °C). Portions of northeastern Maine had their first ever excessive heat warning on record. Cooling centers were opened at Boston University, as well as cities such as New York City and Philadelphia. Daily record highs on June 19 were broken in Boston and Hartford, Connecticut. The heat began to shift south over the coming days. On June 22, Washington DC crossed the century mark for the first time since 2016, ending the fifth longest streak on record for the city.

On July 5, Palm Springs, California reached 124 °F (51 °C), breaking the record for the city's highest temperature. On July 6, Redding, California saw 119 °F (48.3 °C) temperatures, breaking its all-time record. As of that day, it was reported that Phoenix, Arizona had seen 13 heat-related deaths in 2024, with 160 more unconfirmed. On July 7, Las Vegas, Nevada broke its all-time temperature record, with the city seeing 120 °F (49 °C) temperatures. The city would go on to record three more days of temperatures above the pre-2024 record of 117 °F (47 °C).

On July 8, the Third Avenue Bridge stopped working and was closed down due to the heat; temperatures in New York City that day were 95 °F (35 °C). On July 16, the New Jersey Transit experienced delays due to the heat. That day, Washington DC hit 104 °F (40 °C), the highest temperature there since 2012, and was the first time since the Dust Bowl temperatures exceeded the century mark for three days. A record breaking fourth day would occur on July 17, with temperatures of 101 °F (38 °C). A record high temperature was also tied in Hartford.

July 2024 was the hottest calendar month on record in many cities across the western United States, including Las Vegas, Palm Springs, Fresno, Redding, Salem, and San Jose.

On August 27, several cities in Illinois and Indiana set heat records. On August 28, the heat spread east, resulting in record highs being set in Washington DC and Columbus, Ohio. Nashville exceeded 100 °F (38 °C) for three days in a row, culminating in a record high on August 29.

By 27 September, 664 deaths in Phoenix and 342 in Las Vegas were linked to heat illnesses caused by prolonged triple-digit temperatures, beating the 2023 record of heatwave deaths in Las Vegas.

== Central America ==
In Guatemala, outdoor activities were suspended in Guatemala City schools due to the increased risk of heat stroke.

In Honduras, Northern regions including San Pedro Sula had blackouts caused by transformer failures due to the increased prolonged heat.

== See also ==
- 2024 in Mexico
- 2023 Western North America heat wave
- 2021 Western North America heat wave
- List of heat waves
