= The Hours with You =

2014 film

- Film poster
- Directed by: Catalina Aguilar Mastretta
- Produced by: Roberto Sneider
- Starring: Cassandra Ciangherotti; María Rojo
- Music by: Victor Hernández Stumpfhauser
- Release date: 21 March 2014 (GIFF)
- Running time: 88 minutes
- Country: Mexico
- Language: Spanish

The Hours with You (Spanish: Las horas contigo) is a 2014 Mexican drama film by Catalina Aguilar Mastretta in her directorial debut.

== Cast ==
- Cassandra Ciangherotti - Ema
- María Rojo - Julieta
- Isela Vega - Abu
- Arcelia Ramírez - Isabel
