= Raquel Buenrostro Sánchez =

Mexican politician (born 1970)

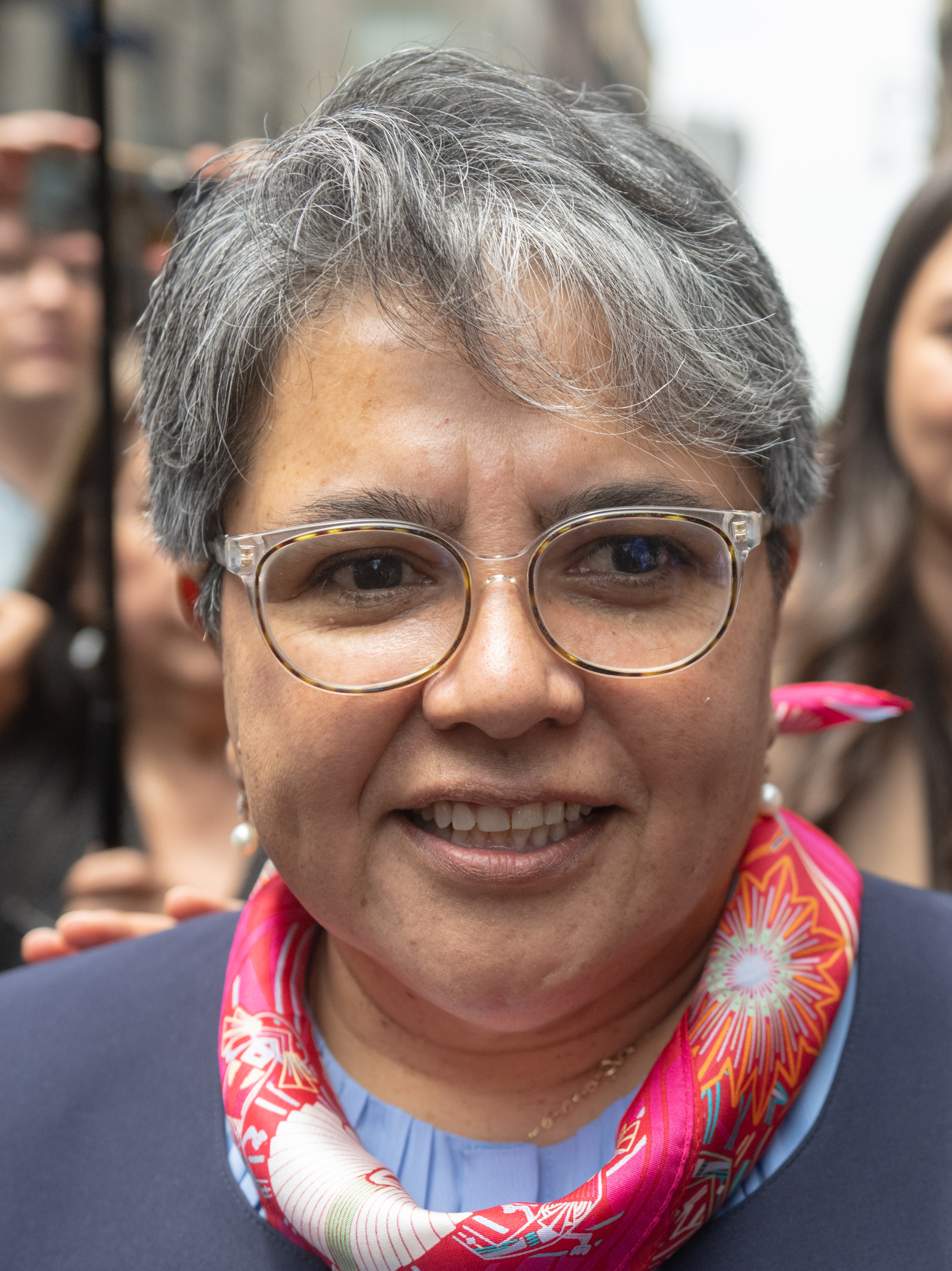
- Buenrostro Sánchez in 2024

Secretary of Anticorruption and Good Governance
- Incumbent
- Assumed office 1 October 2024
- President: Claudia Sheinbaum
- Preceded by: Roberto Salcedo Aquino

Secretary of Economy
- In office 7 October 2022 – 30 September 2024
- President: Andrés Manuel López Obrador
- Preceded by: Tatiana Clouthier
- Succeeded by: Marcelo Ebrard

Personal details
- Born: 23 March 1970 (age 56)
- Party: Independent

Raquel Buenrostro Sánchez (born 23 March 1970) is a Mexican politician serving as secretary of anticorruption and good governance since 2024. From 2022 to 2024, she served as secretary of economy, and supported the United States-Mexico-Canada Agreement (USCMA), noting in November 2022 its likely beneficial impact on the Mexican economy.

From 2020 to 2022, she served as director of the Servicio de Administración Tributaria.
