= José Guadalupe Galván Galindo =

Roman Catholic prelate (1941–2022)

His Excellency José Guadalupe Galván Galindo
- Bishop Emeritus of Torreón
- Archdiocese: Durango
- Diocese: Torreón
- Appointed: 12 October 2000
- Term ended: 9 September 2017
- Predecessor: Luis Morales Reyes
- Successor: Luis Martín Barraza Beltrán
- Previous post: Bishop of Ciudad Valles (1994–2000)

Orders
- Ordination: 29 June 1965 by Alfonso Espino y Silva
- Consecration: 10 August 1994 by Girolamo Prigione

Personal details
- Born: 21 August 1941 Cadereyta, Nuevo León, Mexico
- Died: 16 July 2022 (aged 80) Torreón, Mexico

José Guadalupe Galván Galindo (21 August 1941 – 16 July 2022) was a Mexican Roman Catholic prelate.

Galván Galindo was born in Mexico and was ordained to the priesthood in 1965. He served as bishop of the Roman Catholic Diocese of Ciudad Valles, Mexico from 1994 to 2000 and as bishop of the Roman Catholic Diocese of Torreón, Mexico from 2000 until his retirement in 2017.

Catholic Church titles
Preceded by Luis Morales Reyes	Bishop of Torreón; 2000–2017	Succeeded by Luis Martín Barraza Beltrán
Preceded by Juvencio González Alvarez	Bishop of Ciudad Valles; 1994–2000	Succeeded by Roberto Octavio Balmori Cinta
