= Ana y Bruno =

2017 film directed by Carlos Carrera

- Film poster
- Spanish: Ana y Bruno
- Literally: Ana & Bruno
- Directed by: Carlos Carrera
- Written by: Daniel Emil; Flavio González Mello
- Based on: Ana by Daniel Emil
- Produced by: Pablo Baksht; Alex García; Mónica Lozano; Fernando de Fuentes; José C. García de Letona
- Starring: Galia Mayer; Marina de Tavira; Damián Alcázar; Silverio Palacios; Regina Orozco; Héctor Bonilla; Álvaro Guerrero; Daniel Carrera Pasternac
- Music by: Victor Hernández Stumpfhauser
- Production companies: Altavista Films; Lo Coloco Films; Ítaca Films; Ánima Estudios; Discreet Arts Productions
- Distributed by: Corazon Films
- Release dates: 12 June 2017 (Annecy); 31 August 2018
- Running time: 96 minutes
- Country: Mexico
- Language: Spanish
- Budget: $5.35 million
- Box office: MX$21.3 million ($0.96 million)

Ana y Bruno (English: Ana and Bruno) is a 2018 Mexican animated horror comedy-drama film directed by Carlos Carrera, based on the novel Ana by Daniel Emil, who co-wrote the screenplay with Flavio González Mello. It was produced by Altavista Films and Lo Coloco Films, and co-produced by Ítaca Films and Ánima Estudios.

After 13 years of production, the film was released in Mexico on 31 August 2018, receiving favorable reviews. It was described as the most expensive animated film in the Mexican film industry with a budget of $104 million pesos (est. $5.35 million USD).

The film has won three "Best Animated Feature" awards including one from the 61st Ariel Awards in which the film has also earned nominations for "Adapted Screenplay" and "Original Score".

== Plot ==
A young girl named Ana searches for her father to help save her troubled mother.

== Voice cast ==
- Galia Mayer as Ana
- Marina de Tavira as Carmen
- Damián Alcázar as Ricardo
- Silverio Palacios as Bruno
- Julieta Egurrola as Martita
- Regina Orozco as Rosi
- Héctor Bonilla as Mendez
- Daniel Carrera Pasternac as Daniel

== Release ==
The film had its premiere at the Annecy International Animated Film Festival on 17 June 2017, and later Morelia International Film Festival on 28 October 2017.

The film was released in theaters in Mexico on 31 August 2018, distributed by Corazon Films. It later premiered exclusively on the Pantaya digital platform in the United States with english dub.

=== Box-office ===
Ana y Bruno debuted at #6, grossing $16.8 million pesos in its first week, bombing at the national box-office. It grossed a total of $21.3 million pesos (est. $1.1 million USD)

== Reception ==
Prior to its release, the film has received praise from other acclaimed Mexican film directors, including Alfonso Cuarón and Guillermo del Toro. The film received favorable reviews from critics upon release, with many praising the story and theme, while criticism is focused on the animation and content. On Rotten Tomatoes, the film has a 71% rating based on reviews from 7 critics.

The film was criticized by some parents, calling it "unsuitable" for younger viewers, and even caused some to leave theaters early during the film's showings. Mexico's RTC film rating system, gave the film an "A" rating, allowing attendance of viewers of all ages (equivalent to the "G" MPAA rating) which received some backlash. The nature of the film's plot is focused on real-life situations such as mental illness and death, and has a "dark tone" which parents call "depressing". They also criticized the designs of certain characters in the film for being "terrifying". Other family viewers have praised the film's story and writing, while otherwise criticizing the overall content. It is believed that the film's controversy has led to its underperformance.

== Accolades ==
Year	Award	Category	Nominees	Result
2018	15th Premios Canacine	Mejor Película de Animación (Best Animated Film)	Ana y Bruno	Won
2019	2018 Premios Quirino	Best Ibero-American Animation Feature Film	Carlos Carrera	Won
2019	61st Ariel Awards	Mejor guion adaptado (Best Adapted Screenplay)	Daniel Emil, Flavio González Mello	Nominated
2019	61st Ariel Awards	Mejor largometraje animado (Best Feature Animation)	Carlos Carrera	Won
2019	61st Ariel Awards	Música original (Original Music)	Victor Hernández Stumpfhauser	Nominated
