= De perfil =

Book by José Agustín

- Author: José Agustín
- Language: Spanish
- Publication date: 1966
- Publication place: Mexico
- Media type: Print (hardcover and paperback)
- Preceded by: La Tumba

De perfil (Profile view) is a 1966 novel by José Agustín. Like his first novel, La tumba, De perfil was a best-seller, and furthered Agustin's reputation as a writer.

Set in Mexico City, specifically in an urban middle-class neighborhood in the 1960s, the novel covers in detail three days in the life of the main character, an unnamed young man who is going to enter high school.

The novel is longer and more complex, yet more polished and natural than La tumba. It does not have a particular theme or purpose, following the main character most of the time, in the present, first person. X is rebellious but his naivety and inexperience embarrasses him from time to time. To protect himself he would assume an experienced or indifferent air, but he is aware of his hypocrisy. By the novel's end, the reader has felt what is like to be X, and reads a kind of wild dream of his future as boyfriend of Queta and student leader, and of his past as a tiny baby in his mother's arms.

== Plot summary ==
The novel opens with the phrase "Behind the rock is the world I live in" and the reader finds him smoking cigarettes in his home's garden, hiding from his parents behind a big rock. (In Mexico it is common but not compulsory to live with one's parents until marriage, even if one has the means to support oneself).

The son of a psychiatrist and a housewife, he has a younger brother he cannot stand because he acts like his psychiatrist father all the time. Also, he assumes that his parents could get a divorce and has doubts about whether he is their real son (X jokes that he is adopted). His friend Ricardo is shy and naïve and is obsessed with the idea of leaving his home, for which he tries to convince the main character to do the same, so they can do it together. Ricardo is very attached to X, the closest thing to a name the main character gets in the novel (given by Ricardo in one of his "confidential" plans in his diary), but X thinks Ricardo is too childish. No one can think that Ricardo has a crush on X, but he has an absence in the father figure pattern, substituting X even if he tortures him all the time. X meets many kinds of people: a fledgling music group about to make their first record (Los suásticos) and their homosexual manager, a young and rich female singer (Queta) with which he has an affair, his odd and cynical neighbor Octavio, who does not have any aspirations aside from being a rock star even though he does not belong in a band, his pedantic and snobbish intellectual cousin (Esteban) who berates X' for his conventional lifestyle, and other characters, most with some artistic or intellectual aspiration, including student leaders that are highly political (a future vision of events that will happen in the next five years in Mexico).

== Major themes ==
The narrative is fluid and ever changing and it consists mainly of X's thoughts written in different styles. There are also memories, the point of view of a different character, a few flashbacks from his family past, and finally a technique very common in Jose Agustin's work: mixing the character's speech with the narrative, without making any distinction in typography or punctuation, leaving it to the reader to discern which character is speaking. Other times spacing and font size delineate speech.
