= Diocese of Ciudad Valles =

Latin Catholic jurisdiction in Mexico

Coordinates: 21.9886°N 99.0136°W

Diocese of Ciudad Valles Dioecesis Vallipolitana Diócesis de Ciudad Valles

Location
- Country: Mexico
- Ecclesiastical province: San Luis Potosí

Statistics
- Area: 5,512 sq mi (14,280 km^{2})
- Population: Total; Catholics: (as of 2006); 999,000; 939,000 (94%)
- Parishes: 42

Information
- Denomination: Catholic Church
- Sui iuris church: Latin Church
- Rite: Roman Rite
- Established: 27 November 1960 (65 years ago)
- Cathedral: Cathedral of Our Lady of Guadalupe

Current leadership
- Pope: Leo XIV
- Bishop: Roberto Yenny García
- Metropolitan Archbishop: Jorge Alberto Cavazos Arizpe
- Bishops emeritus: Roberto Octavio Balmori Cinta, M.J.

Map
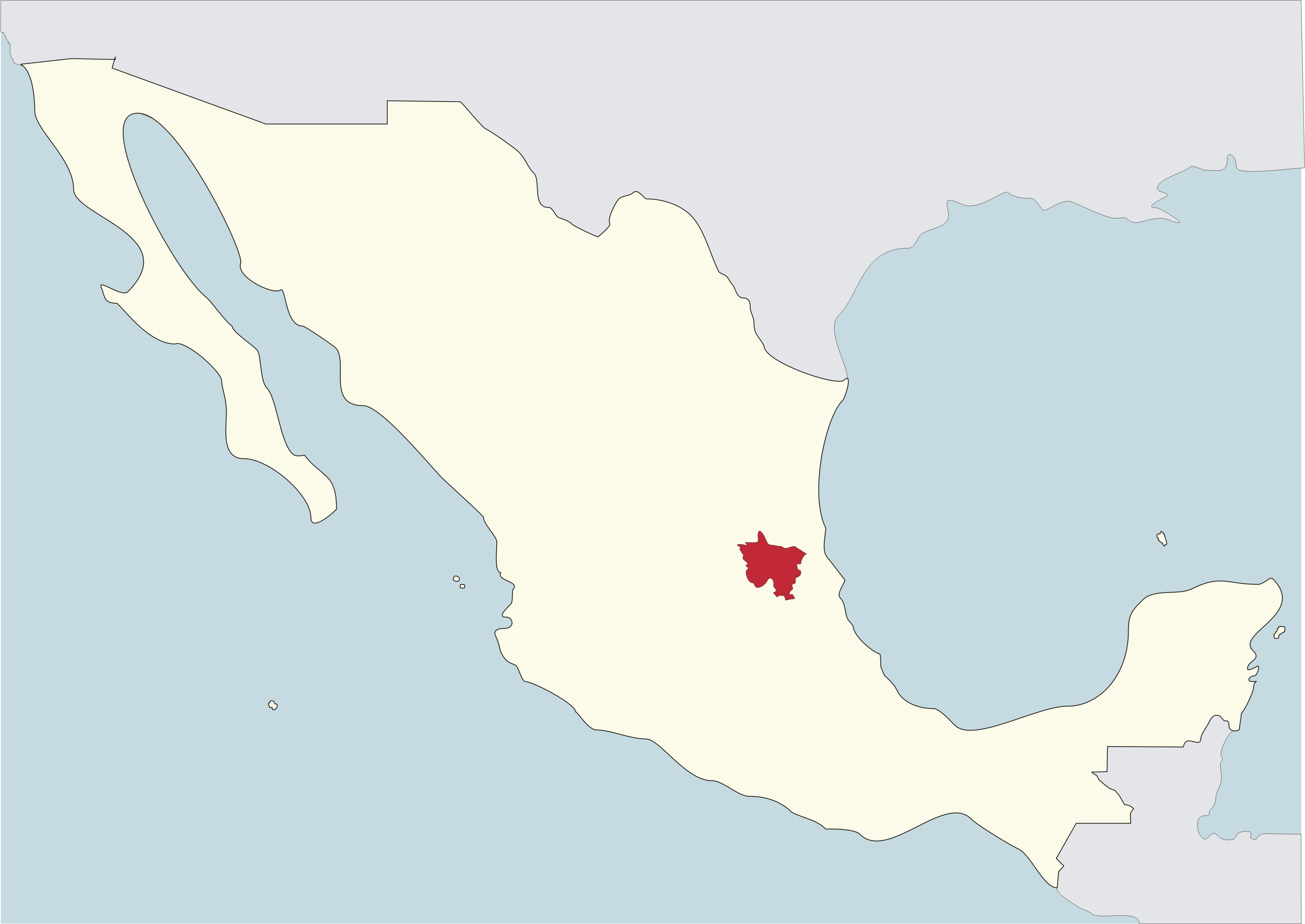

Website
- www.diocesisdeciudadvalles.org.mx

The Diocese of Ciudad Valles (Latin: Dioecesis Vallipolitana) is a Latin Church ecclesiastical territory diocese of the Catholic Church in Mexico. The diocese was erected on 27 November 1960. It is a suffragan in the ecclesiastical province of the metropolitan Archdiocese of San Luis Potosí. It was a suffragan of the Archdiocese of Monterrey until 25 November 2006. It cathedra is found within the Cathedral of Our Lady of Guadalupe in the episcopal see of Ciudad Valles, San Luis Potosí.

== Bishops ==
=== Ordinaries ===
- Carlos Quintero Arce (1961 - 1966)
- Alfonso Reyes Ramos (1966 - 1969)
- José Melgoza Osorio (1970 - 1979)
- Juvencio González Alvarez (1980 - 1995)
- José Guadalupe Galván Galindo (1994 - 2000)
- Roberto Octavio Balmori Cinta, M.J. (2002 - 2020)
- Roberto Yenny García (2020 - present)

=== Other priest of this diocese who became bishop ===
- Héctor Luis Morales Sánchez, appointed Prelate of Huautla, Oaxaca in 2005

== Territorial losses ==
Year	Along with	To form
1997	Archdiocese of San Luis Potosí	Diocese of Matehuala

== External links and references ==
- "Diocese of Ciudad Valles". Catholic-Hierarchy.
