= Cassandra Ciangherotti =

Mexican actress and producer

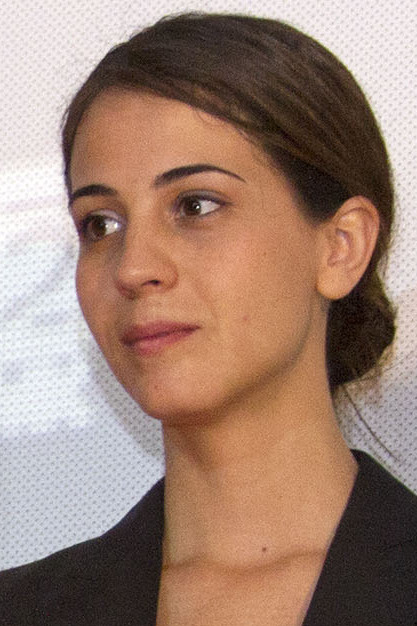
- Ciangherotti in 2014
- Born: 14 February 1987 (age 39); Mexico City, Mexico
- Occupations: Actress; producer
- Years active: 2007–present
- Father: Fernando Luján
- Relatives: Alejandro Ciangherotti (grandfather); Fernando Ciangherotti (brother)

Cassandra Ciangherotti (born 14 February 1987) is a Mexican actress and producer, best known for her role in the 2015 Mexican drama film The Hours with You, for which she was nominated for an Ariel Award for Best Supporting Actress in that same year. The following year she was nominated in the same category at the Ariel Awards, for her participation in the film Tiempos felices (2014).

== Family ==
Cassandra is the daughter of Fernando Luján and Adriana Parra. She is the granddaughter of the actor Alejandro Ciangherotti, and the younger sister of actors Fernando Ciangherotti and Vanessa Ciangherotti.

== Filmography ==
=== Film roles ===
Year	Title	Roles	Notes
2007	Hasta el viento tiene miedo		Feature film debut
2008	Kada kien su karma	Inés	
2009	Viaje redondo	Fernanda	
2009	Paradas contínuas	Lisa	
2010	También la lluvia	María	
2010	El baile de San Juan	Victoria de la Villa	
2011	Perdido por Antonia	Antonia	Short film
2013	Tlatelolco, verano del 68	Ana María	
2014	Cantinflas	Estela Pagola	
2014	Tiempos felices	Mónica Villalobos	
2015	The Hours with You	Ema	
2015	Los parecidos	Irene	
2015	La Pascualita	Daughter	Short film
2016	Espero que estés bien	Waitress	Short film
2017	Cygnus	Diana Hernández	Also as associate producer
2017	Opus Zero	Fernanda	
2018	Tiempo compartido	Eva	
2018	El club de los insomnes	Danny	
2018	The Good Girls	Alejandra	
2018	Camila	Carmen	Short film
2018	El aire delgado	Sonia	Short film
2019	Ready to Mingle	Ana	
2023	Familia	Julia	Netflix film
2025	The Follies		Netflix film

=== Television roles ===
Year	Title	Roles	Notes
2010	Locas de amor	Frida	Recurring role; 25 episodes
2010	Para volver a amar	Laila	Recurring role; 35 episodes
2019–2022	Los Espookys	Úrsula	Main role; 12 episodes
