= Happy Times (2014 film) =

- Directed by: Luis Javier Henaine
- Written by: Alejandra Olvera Avila
- Starring: Luis Arrieta; Cassandra Ciangherotti
- Cinematography: Diego García
- Edited by: Branko Gómez Palacio
- Music by: Marc Collin
- Distributed by: Cinépolis
- Release date: 21 October 2014 (Morelia International Film Festival)
- Country: Mexico
- Language: Spanish

Happy Times (Spanish: Tiempos felices) is a 2014 Mexican comedy film directed by Luis Javier Henaine. The film premiered first on 21 October 2014 at the Morelia International Film Festival. And subsequently it was distributed by Cinépolis in 31 cities of Mexico on 20 February 2015. It stars Luis Arrieta, and Cassandra Ciangherotti.

== Plot ==
Max (Luis Arrieta) is a nerd and designer who has Mónica (Cassandra Ciangherotti) as a girlfriend, nothing spectacular; In fact, so annoying that the protagonist is fed up with her but does not know how to end the relationship because when he tries, he always ends up in bed with her. For this reason, Max decides to hire the services of "Abaddon", an agency specialized in ending courtships with unorthodox techniques; however, they make everything more complicated than it seems.

== Cast ==
- Luis Arrieta as Max Quintana
- Cassandra Ciangherotti as Mónica Villalobos
- Bárbara de Regil as Andrea Villalobos
- Jorge Caballero as Agency Researcher
- Fernando Becerril as Señor Villalobos
- Roger Cudney as Dr. Guillermo Murray
- Fernando Gaviria as Mamado
- Iván Arana as Rigo
- Veronica Falcón as Tía de Mónica
