= Archdiocese of San Luis Potosí =

Latin Catholic jurisdiction in Mexico

Coordinates: 22.1517°N 100.9760°W

Archdiocese of San Luis Potosí Archidioecesis Sancti Ludovici Potosiensis Arquidiócesis de San Luis Potosí
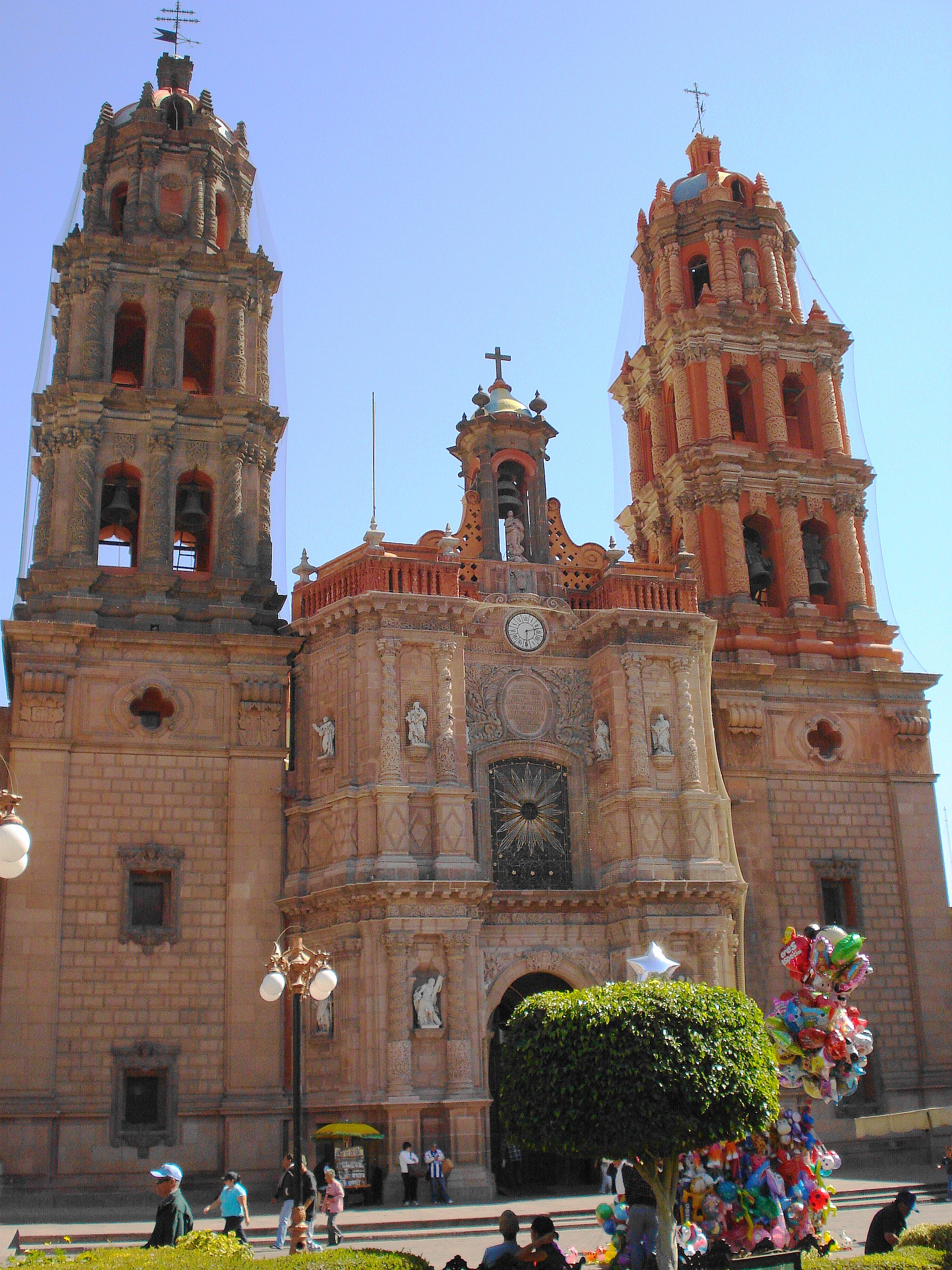
- Catedral Metropolitana de San Luis Rey

Location
- Country: Mexico
- Ecclesiastical province: San Luis Potosí

Statistics
- Area: 7,504 sq mi (19,440 km^{2})
- Population: Total; Catholics: (as of 2010); 1,925,000; 1,845,000 (95.8%)
- Parishes: 107

Information
- Denomination: Catholic Church
- Sui iuris church: Latin Church
- Rite: Roman Rite
- Established: 31 August 1854 (171 years ago)
- Cathedral: Metropolitan Cathedral of St. Louis the King

Current leadership
- Pope: Leo XIV
- Archbishop: Jorge Alberto Cavazos Arizpe
- Bishops emeritus: Jesús Carlos Cabrero Romero

Map

Website
- www.iglesiapotosina.org

The Archdiocese of San Luis Potosí (Latin: Archidioecesis Sancti Ludovici Potosiensis) is a Latin Church ecclesiastical jurisdiction or archdiocese of the Catholic Church in Mexico. A metropolitan see, its ecclesiastical province contains three suffragan dioceses: Ciudad Valles, Matehuala and Zacatecas. The cathedra is found within the Cathedral of St. Louis the King in the episcopal see of San Luis Potosí.

== Bishops ==
- Pedro Barajas y Moreno (1854–1868)
- Manuel del Conde y Blanco (1869–1872)
- José Nicanor Corona e Izarraraz (1873–1883)
- Jose Maria Ignacio Montes de Oca y Obregón (1884–1921)
- Miguel María de la Mora y Mora (1922–1930)
- Guillermo Tritschler y Córdova (1931–1941), appointed Archbishop of Monterrey, Nuevo León
- Gerardo Anaya y Diez de Bonilla (1941–1958)
- Luis Cabrera Cruz (1958–1967)
- Estanislao Alcaraz y Figueroa (1968–1972), appointed Archbishop of Morelia, Michoacán
- Ezequiel Perea Sánchez (1972–1986)
- Arturo Antonio Szymanski Ramírez (1987–1999)
- Luis Morales Reyes (1999–2012) – Archbishop emeritus
- Jesús Carlos Cabrero Romero (2012–2022) – Archbishop emeritus
- Jorge Alberto Cavazos Arizpe (2022–present)

Other priests of this diocese who became bishops

- José Luis Dibildox Martínez, appointed Bishop of Tarahumara, Chihuahua in 1993
- Juan Manuel Mancilla Sánchez, appointed Auxiliary Bishop of Texcoco, México in 2001
- Lucas Martínez Lara, appointed Bishop of Matehuala, San Luís Potosí in 2006
- Andrés Vargas Peña, appointed Auxiliary Bishop of México, Federal District in 2010

== See also ==
- List of Roman Catholic archdioceses in México

== External links and references ==
- "Archdiocese of San Luis Potosí". Catholic-Hierarchy.
