= Ignacio Montes de Oca y Obregón =

Mexican archbishop

Most Reverend Ignacio Montes de Oca y Obregón
- Bishop of San Luis Potosí
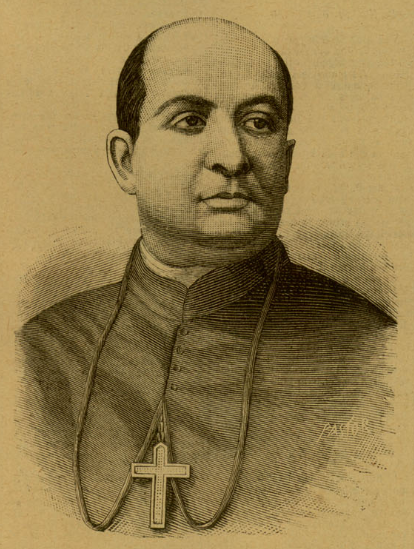
- Church: Catholic Church
- Diocese: Roman Catholic Archdiocese of San Luis Potosí
- In office: 1884–1921
- Predecessor: José Nicanor Corona e Izarraraz
- Successor: Miguel María de la Mora y Mora

Orders
- Ordination: 28 February 1863
- Consecration: 12 March 1871 by Pius IX

Personal details
- Born: June 26, 1840 Guanajuato, Guanajuato, Mexico
- Died: August 19, 1921 (aged 81) New York City, U.S.

José María Ignacio Montes de Oca y Obregón (26 June 1840 – 19 August 1921) was a Mexican archbishop of the Roman Catholic Church.

A 1905 newspaper article in the St. Louis Globe-Democrat referred to him as "the greatest orator and one of the most learned prelates of the Catholic church of Mexico". At the time, Montes de Oca had been reprimanded by Pope Pius X for a publishing a letter that was critical of a delegation previously sent to Mexico by Pope Leo XIII.

Montes de Oca died in New York City in 1921 while visiting the rector of St. Patrick's Cathedral, shortly after returning from a trip to Spain. It was noted that he had written over 100 books on "ecclesiastical subjects, literature, and poetry".

== Sources ==
- Archbishop Jose Maria Ignacio Montes de Oca y Obregón at catholic-hierarchy.org

Catholic Church titles
Preceded by Giustino Adami	Titular Archbishop of Caesarea Ponti; 1920 - 1921	Succeeded by See suppressed
Preceded by José Nicanor Corona e Izarraraz	Bishop of San Luis Potosí; 1884 - 1921	Succeeded by Miguel María de la Mora y Mora
Preceded by Francisco de Paula Verea y González de Hermosillo	Bishop of Linares; 1879 - 1884	Succeeded by Jacinto López y Romo
Preceded by Francisco de la Concepción Ramírez y González	Bishop of Tamaulipas; 1871 - 1879	Succeeded by Eduardo Sánchez Camacho
