= Celeste Sánchez Romero =

Mexican politician and dental researcher (1990–2022)

Federal deputy for Durango
- In office 1 September 2021 – 22 February 2022

Personal details
- Born: 8 February 1990 Durango City, Durango State, Mexico
- Died: 21 February 2022 (aged 32) Durango, Durango, Mexico
- Party: PT
- Occupation: Dentist

Celeste Sánchez Romero (8 February 1990 – 21 February 2022) was a Mexican dental researcher and federal deputy from the Labor Party (PT) in the first six months of the LXV Legislature of the Mexican Congress. Prior to becoming a legislator, she was an academic researcher.

== Education and research ==
Sánchez Romero graduated from the Universidad Juárez del Estado de Durango in 2013 with a degree in dentistry. She obtained master's and doctorate degrees from the Piracicaba Dental Faculty of the State University of Campinas in Brazil. She later became an adjunct faculty member of the Universidad de la República in Uruguay and had 47 scientific articles published in indexed publications. In 2020, she was designated a Level I researcher in the Sistema Nacional de Investigadores.

== Political career ==
In 2021, she was elected to serve as a proportional representation federal deputy from the Labor Party out of the first electoral region (which includes Durango), taking the PT's only seat from that region. She served as secretary on the Science, Technology and Innovation Commission and also sat on the Health and Youth commissions. On the Health Commission, she was involved in debate over reforms to GMO labeling requirements.

== Personal life and death ==
Sánchez Romero was found dead in her Durango home on 21 February 2022, at the age of 32. An autopsy revealed pulmonary aspiration to be the cause of death. That Friday, she had been in Durango to participate in a forum on proposed changes to laws governing the electricity sector. The Durango Attorney General's Office later announced that her death was a suicide by overdose, citing as evidence a suicide note and a syringe that had been found with her body.

She was replaced by her alternate, María de Jesús Paéz Guereca, in the Chamber of Deputies.
