= Diocese of Torreón =

Roman Catholic diocese in Mexico

Diocese of Torreón Dioecesis Torreonensis Diócesis de Torreón
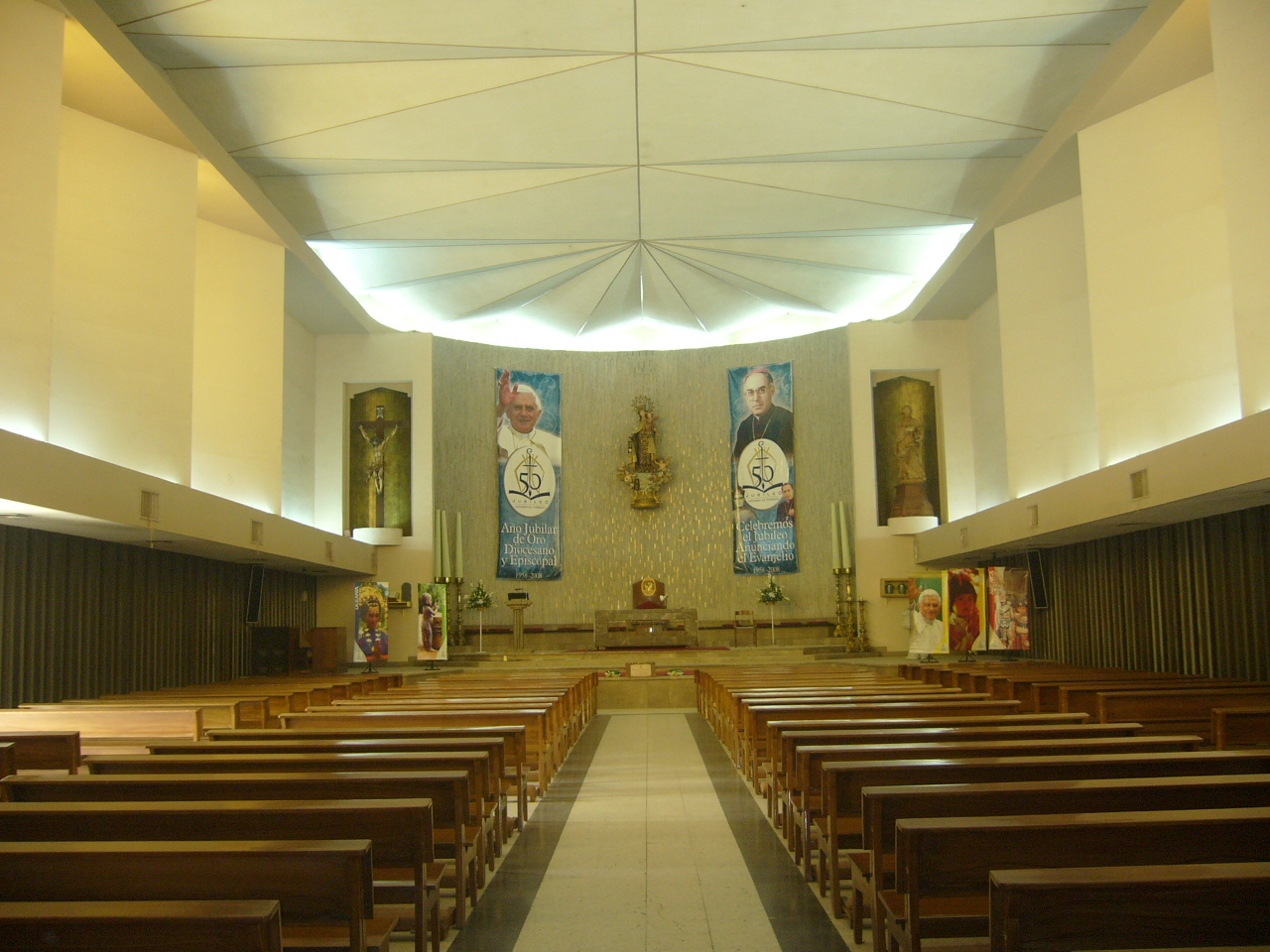
- Catedral de Nuestra Señora de Carmen

Location
- Country: Mexico
- Ecclesiastical province: Province of Durango
- Metropolitan: Torreón

Statistics
- Area: 8,679 sq mi (22,480 km^{2})
- Population: Total; Catholics: (as of 2006); 867,543; 694,034 (80%)
- Parishes: 66

Information
- Denomination: Roman Catholic
- Rite: Roman Rite
- Established: 19 June 1957 (69 years ago)
- Cathedral: Cathedral of Our Lady of Mount Carmel

Current leadership
- Pope: Leo XIV
- Bishop: Luis Martín Barraza Beltrán, Ist. del Prado

Map
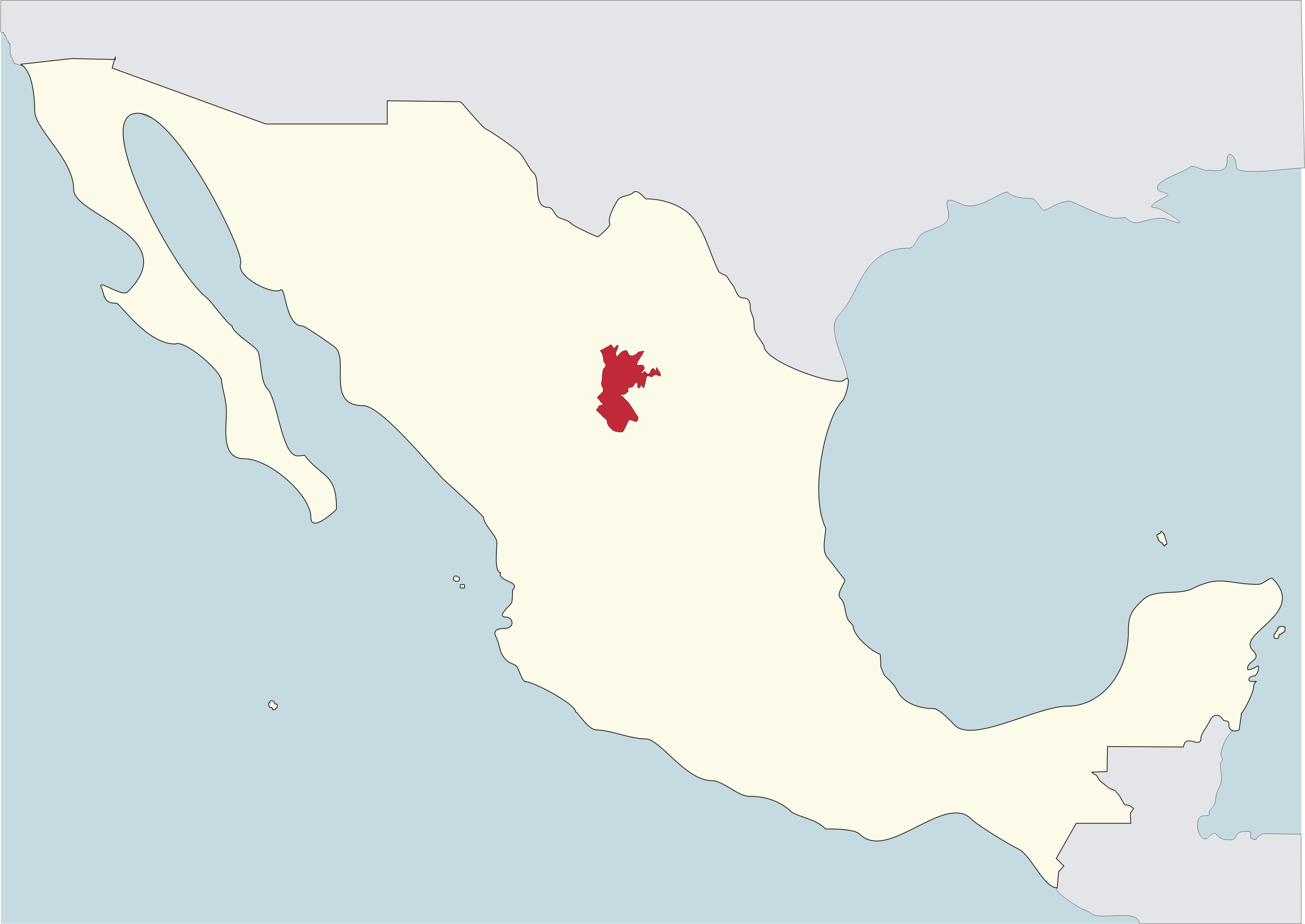

Website
- www.diocesisdetorreon.org

The Roman Catholic Diocese of Torreón (Latin: Dioecesis Torreonensis) (erected 19 June 1957) is a suffragan diocese of the Archdiocese of Durango.

The diocese was the second one created in the state of Coahuila. It consists of the five municipalities that form the Laguna region of the State: Torreón, Francisco I. Madero, Viesca, Matamoros and San Pedro. Before 1959 the territory was part of the Diocese of Saltillo.

== Bishops ==
=== Ordinaries ===
- Fernando Romo Gutiérrez (1958 - 1990)
- Luis Morales Reyes (1990 - 1999), appointed Archbishop of San Luis Potosí, México
- José Guadalupe Galván Galindo (2000 - 2017)
- Luis Martín Barraza Beltrán, Ist. del Prado (2017 - )

=== Coadjutor bishop ===
- Luis Morales Reyes (1985-1990)

== Episcopal See ==
- Torreón, Coahuila

== External links and references ==
- "Diocese of Torreón". Catholic-Hierarchy.
