= Victor Hernández Stumpfhauser =

Mexican musician and film score composer (born 1980)

Víctor Hernández Stumpfhauser
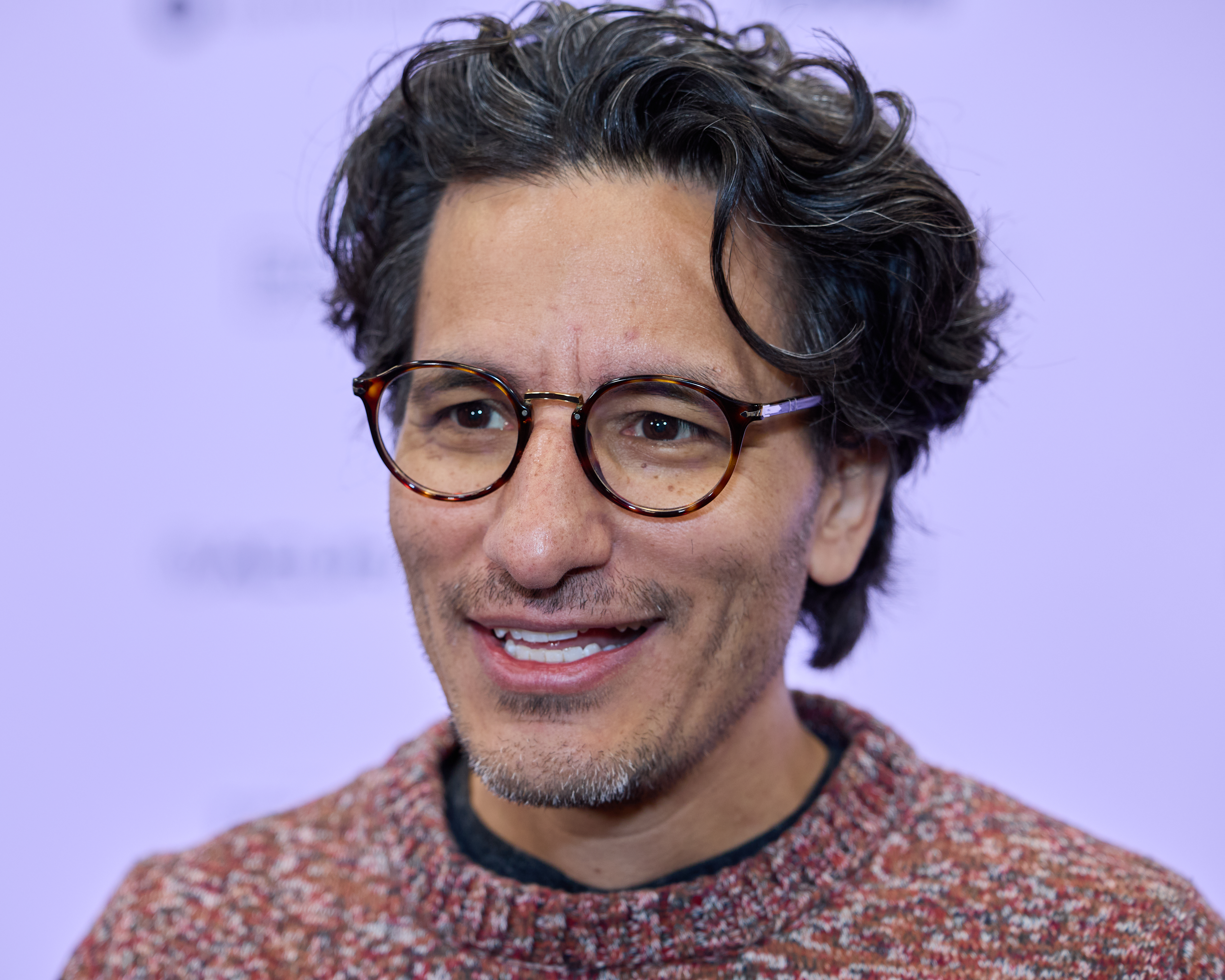

Background information
- Born: 13 April 1980 (age 46); Morelia, Michoacán, México
- Genre: Film scores
- Occupations: Composer, musician, pianist
- Instruments: Piano, keyboard, synthesizer, guitar
- Website: victorhs.com

Victor Hernández Stumpfhauser (born 13 April 1980 in Morelia, Michoacán) is an Emmy nominated Mexican musician and film score composer.

== Education and career ==
Hernández Stumpfhauser is one of the newer generations of Mexican film composers, he is an alumnus of the National Autonomous University of Mexico's National School of Music, who graduated with a bachelor's degree with honors in piano performance. His work has been showcased in various feature and short films, including the double Primetime Emmy award-winning television movie Hemingway & Gellhorn. He wrote and/or performed three musical pieces for the multiple Academy Award-winning motion picture by Alejandro González Iñárritu, Birdman or (The Unexpected Virtue of Ignorance).

More recently, Hernández Stumpfhauser wrote the score for the Quirino Award winning animated feature film Ana y Bruno (2018).

== Awards ==
Award	Year	Project	Category	Outcome
Diosas de Plata	2016	The Hours with You	Best Music	Nominated
Pantalla de Cristal Film Festival	2017	You're Killing Me Susana	Best Original Score	Won

== Filmography ==
=== Films ===
- Lioness of Lisabi (2008) (short film)
- How I Killed Mumblecore (2009)
- Quarter 'til Two (2009) (short film)
- Black Swan 2: Epidemic (2011) (short film)
- Aquí entre nos (2011)
- Victims of Gravity (2011)
- Field of Dreams 2: Lockout (2011)
- Cuando estemos juntos (2011)
- Casi treinta (2014)
- Birdman or (The Unexpected Virtue of Ignorance) (2014) (performer)
- The Hours with You (2014)
- Alivio (2015)
- Me estás matando, Susana (2016)
- Siempre Contigo(2016)
- Helena (2016)
- Everybody Loves Somebody (2017)
- Ana y Bruno (2018)
- Souvenir (2018)

=== Television ===
- Sesame Street (2012–15) (additional music)
- Diablo Guardián (2017)
