= Ciudades desiertas =

1982 novel by José Agustín

- Author: José Agustín
- Language: Spanish
- Publisher: Edivisión, Compañía Editorial
- Publication date: January 1, 1982
- Pages: 200

Ciudades desiertas (Empty Cities or Deserted Cities) is a 1982 novel written in Spanish by Mexican author José Agustín. It is a mature work set in a small city in the United States around the early 1980s.

== Plot ==
Ciudades desiertas is the story of Susana, a female Mexican writer fleeing her home to attend an international workshop in the United States, leaving her husband Eligio behind and completely unaware of her whereabouts. A hot-tempered intellectual with a somewhat cynical and misanthropic sense of humor, he works his way to catch up with his wife, arguing to have only done so to find out why exactly Susana left.

== Adaptations ==
Roberto Sneider's 2016 feature-length film Me estás matando, Susana is based on the novel.
