= Roberto Salcedo Aquino =

Mexican politician

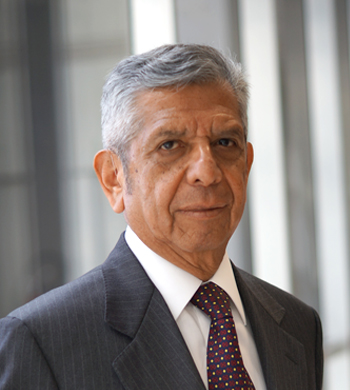
Roberto Salcedo Aquino.

Roberto Salcedo Aquino (born 26 November 1943) is a Mexican politician, civil servant, teacher and writer. He has served as Secretariat of the Civil Service in the Cabinet of Mexico from 2021 to 2024.
