= Aronia Wilson Tambo =

Mexican Cocopah craftswoman, traditional ruler and Indigenous rights activist

- Born: 1 July 1959; Pozas de Arvizu, Sonora, Mexico
- Died: 9 January 2024 (aged 64); Pozas de Arvizu, Sonora
- Known for: Human rights defender and artisan

Aronia Wilson Tambo (1 July 1959 – 9 January 2024) was a Mexican indigenous defender, artisan and traditional governor who advocated for the preservation, conservation and dissemination of the language, culture and political rights of the Cocapah people.

== Biography ==
Aronia Wilson was a member of the Cucapah ethnic group who actively participated in the political and social sphere of her community, considered one of the most recognized indigenous leaders in San Luis Río Colorado, Sonora.

She was the daughter of Enrique Wilson Michel, a Cucapah native of Arizona, United States, and Mrs. Juana Tambo León who belonged to the Cucapah tribe of Baja California. Her parents were both of a prominent lineage whose compound name expresses the historical binational character of this group: Wilson-Tambo. Her brother Nicolás Wilson Tambo is also a recognized leader.

Aronia was an artisan, she made bracelets, necklaces, earrings, and hair clips, preserving her pre-Hispanic style. At the same time, she began to make typical costumes representing her community, made of poplin and cotton, to which she attached colored ribbons so that women and men could wear them on special occasions. She also made the famous pectoral with beads, which women used.

Since 2011 she was responsible for the Cucapá Sipa and Komat Cultural Center.

In 2012, she became the first woman to hold the position of traditional governor, starting as a substitute, having assumed the leadership due to the chronic illness of her brother, the indigenous governor Nicolás Wilson Tambo.

She was also a pioneer of the Cucapah Nations Festival, which aims to bring together other members of the ethnic group spread across various areas.

On two occasions (2012-2015 and 2018-2021) she was an ethnic councilor for the municipality of San Luis Río Colorado.

She was one of the main promoters of the revitalization of the Cucapah culture that sought to preserve the language, and promoted traditional songs and dances, gastronomy and games.

== Murder ==
On 9 January 2024, at the age of 64, she was murdered in her home. The Attorney General's Office of the State of Sonora began the corresponding investigations to clarify the circumstances of her murder. One of the hypotheses is linked to her personal environment and points to her immediate circle.
