= RICH nightclub railing collapse =

Fatal balcony fall from a mall in Mexico

- Date: June 7, 2024
- Venue: Antro RICH
- Location: San Luis Potosí, Mexico; 22.130666°N 101.020094°W
- Cause: Overcrowding leading to balcony railing collapse
- Deaths: 2
- Injuries: 15 (5 critically)

On 7 June 2024, a third-floor balcony railing collapsed outside of the RICH nightclub at the Alttus Corporate Center & Plaza in San Luis Potosí, Mexico, causing about 20 concertgoers to fall from a height of more than 12 meters (39.4 feet) and killing 2 while injuring 15.

== Background ==
Alttus Plaza is a shopping mall and corporate center located in San Luis Potosí, Mexico, whose website claims that it is "located in the most exclusive and prestigious area in the city". The property is made of several open-space terraces surrounded by three-story buildings containing 32 commercial spaces connected with glass balconies on the outside.

On 7 June 2024, The RICH nightclub and venue hosted a performance of the Corridos tumbados singer, Kevin Moreno, well known in Mexico on the TikTok and YouTube social media platforms. The RICH nightclub was located on the third story of the plaza, where concertgoers accessed the venue by either taking an elevator or going up the nearby stairs. Eyewitness reports and recorded video indicated that the stairwell and third-floor space outside RICH was densely packed with waiting concertgoers just prior to the collapse.

The RICH club was owned by a group of businessmen led by Ulises González. An inspection done by Civil Protection services on 14 March 2024 stated that the club lacked any structural or contingency plans. The owners asked for a permit extension to continue operating as a restaurant and bar, but the property still did not meet the necessary conditions to legally operate as a venue on the night of the concert.

RICH organizers allowed more than 1,500 people to attend the concert, despite the venue having a maximum capacity of 200 people. Most of the concertgoers were teenagers and young adults.

== Collapse ==
Witnesses to the collapse stated that the pressure exerted by the dense crowd against the glass railings of the exterior corridors overwhelmed them, causing them to collapse, leading to about 20 people who were leaning on the rail or were close to it to fall more than 12 meters (39.4 feet) from the third floor to the first floor. The concertgoers who fell landed on top of the broken glass of the railing and on top of each other, worsening the injuries of those who fell. Two victims were killed, and fifteen were injured.

Five of the injured were taken to the hospital in critical condition with life-threatening injuries, and several more of the victims suffered nervous breakdowns. Security staff along with civil protection, capital police, and the State Civil Guard provided medical attention to the injured, transported victims to hospitals, and cordoned off the area to prevent danger to anyone near the collapsed railing or the broken glass. Many concertgoers and other bystanders worked to provide aid to the injured.

== Aftermath ==
On the morning of 8 June, authorities closed the plaza, and the San Luis Potosí Attorney General's Office began an investigation into the circumstances behind the railing collapse. Mayor of San Luis Potosí Daniela Cid stated that the RICH nightclub did not have the necessary permits required to host the Kevin Moreno concert, and that the venue organizers carried on with the event despite still waiting to renew their license endorsement and operating outside of regulations. San Luis Potosí district attorneys attempted to contact the owner of the nightclub in order to gather information and evidence, but they could not contact them. Governor Ricardo Gallardo Cardona guaranteed that the "State Commission for Attention to Victims" would pay for funeral and medical expenses and provide legal support to anyone affected by the disaster, and requested the State Attorney General's Office to expedite the investigation and punish the responsible parties to the fullest extent of the law applicable. Following the tragedy, the club staff contacted family members of the victims before deleting their social media accounts.

Kevin Moreno posted a statement to his social media accounts sharing the sorrow he felt for the victims and all the fans and concertgoers impacted by the tragedy, and asserted that he would be there to support them. Kevin Moreno's record label, Poker Music, claimed that the collapse occurred before the start of the concert, and that Kevin Moreno had not yet arrived to the venue at the time of the tragedy.
