= Celaya massacre =

Attack in Central Mexico

- Part of the Mexican drug war
- Celaya massacre (Guanajuato) Celaya massacre (Mexico)
- Location: 20°32′34″N 100°49′17″W; Valle Hermoso, Celaya, Guanajuato, Mexico
- Date: 23 May 2022; 22:00 (CDT)
- Target: Jalisco New Generation Cartel members
- Attack type: Spree shooting, Arson
- Weapons: Assault rifles, Molotov cocktails
- Deaths: 11
- Injuries: 5
- Perpetrator: 15 gunmen of the Santa Rosa de Lima Cartel
- Motive: Gang war

On 23 May 2022, eleven people were killed in a mass shooting at the Gala Hotel and a nearby bar in Celaya, Guanajuato, Mexico.

At about 10 p.m. CDT on 23 May 2022, 15 hooded gunmen from the Santa Rosa de Lima Cartel stormed the Gala Hotel in Celaya. The hotel had a bar at street level, which they stormed into and killed two men and women. The gunmen then entered a bar across the street and killed another man and five women. They reportedly threw molotov cocktails, and torched the hotel, starting a fire which was later put out. One person died in hospital, bringing the total to eleven, with eight women and three men. The attackers left a message on a piece of cardboard referring to the Jalisco New Generation Cartel and three dismembered bodies which were found hours before the attack.
