= Luis Morales Reyes =

Mexican Roman Catholic bishop (1936–2024)

The Most Reverend Luis Morales Reyes
- Archbishop Emeritus of San Luis Potosí
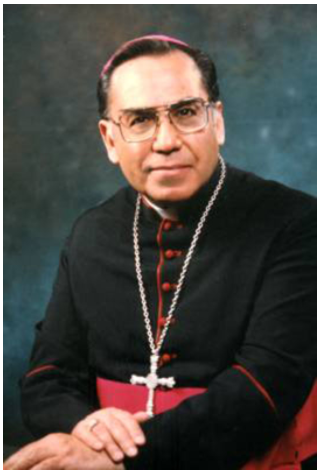
- See: San Luis Potosí
- Installed: 18 March 1999
- Term ended: 3 April 2012
- Predecessor: Arturo Antonio Szymanski Ramírez
- Successor: Jesús Carlos Cabrero Romero
- Previous posts: Auxiliary Bishop of Tacámbaro (1976–1979); Titular Bishop of Burca (1976–1979); Bishop of Tacámbaro (1979–1985); Bishop of Torreón (1990–1999)

Orders
- Ordination: 2 December 1962
- Consecration: 4 May 1976 by José Abraham Martínez Betancourt

Personal details
- Born: Luis Morales Reyes; 5 July 1936 Churumuco, Michoacán, Mexico
- Died: 2 February 2024 (aged 87) San Luis Potosí, San Luis Potosí, Mexico
- Denomination: Roman Catholic

Styles of Luis Morales Reyes
- Reference style: The Most Reverend
- Spoken style: Your Excellency
- Religious style: Archbishop

Luis Morales Reyes (5 July 1936 – 2 February 2024) was a Roman Catholic archbishop-emeritus of the Archdiocese of San Luis Potosí in Mexico. He was succeeded by Jesús Carlos Cabrero Romero as archbishop of San Luis Potosí on 3 April 2012.

== Biography ==
Luis Morales Reyes was born on July 5, 1936 in Churumuco, Michoacán and studied at the Diocesan Seminary of Tacámbaro.

He earned a licentiate in philosophy and theology from the Pontifical Gregorian University. He was ordained a priest for the diocese of Tacámbaro on 2 December 1962, and worked there, among other things, as an advisor to the Christian family movement. Morales later served on the diocesan pastoral council. Pope Paul VI appointed him auxiliary bishop in Tacámbaro and titular bishop of Burca on March 8, 1976. The Bishop of Tacámbaro, José Abraham Martínez Betancourt, gave him episcopal ordination on 4 May of the same year in the Cathedral of San Jerónimo in Tacámbaro de Codallos; Co-consecrators were Mario Pio Gaspari, Apostolic Delegate to Mexico, and Gilberto Valbuena Sánchez, Vicar Apostolic of La Paz en la Baja California Sur. From 1983 to 1985, Morales Reyes was a member of the Commission for the Clergy of the Mexican Bishops' Conference, before serving as Treasurer of the Bishops' Conference until 1991. Pope John Paul II appointed him Bishop of Tacámbaro on 5 June 1979. On 19 February 1985, he was appointed coadjutor bishop of Torreón and installed on April 20 of the same year. After Fernando Romo Gutiérrez retired, he succeeded him as Bishop of Torreón on 27 June 1990. In 1996 he succeeded the late Manuel Pérez-Gil y González as Vice President of the Mexican Bishops' Conference. In 1997 he was elected president for a three-year term. In 2000 he was re-elected to the post.

On 1999 he was appointed Archbishop of San Luis Potosí. He was inaugurated on March 18 of the same year. On 3 April 2012, Pope Benedict XVI. the request for resignation submitted by Luis Morales Reyes for reasons of age. Reyes died on 2 February 2024, at the age of 87.

Catholic Church titles
Preceded by Arturo Antonio Szymanski Ramírez	Archbishop of San Luis Potosí; March 18, 1999 – April 3, 2012	Succeeded by Jesús Carlos Cabrero Romero
Preceded by Fernando Romo Gutiérrez	Bishop of Torreón; 1990–1999	Succeeded by José Guadalupe Galván Galindo
Preceded by Alfredo Galindo Mendoza	Titular Bishop of Burca; 1976–1979	Succeeded by Antonio Troyo Calderón
Preceded by —	Auxiliary Bishop of Tacámbaro; 1976–1979	Succeeded by —
