= Yrma Lydya =

Mexican singer (1999–2022)

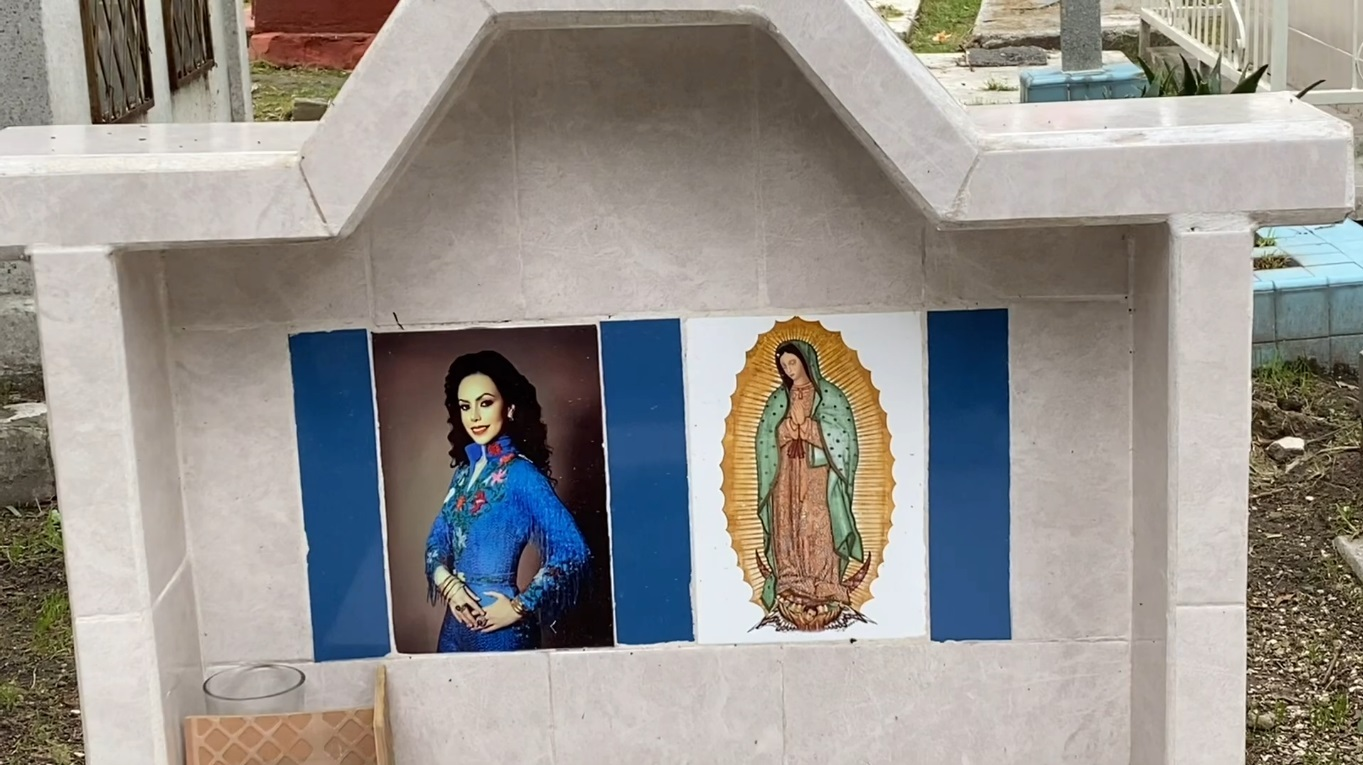
Photograph of Yrma Lydya placed on her tombstone. To one side is an image of the Virgin of Guadalupe (right).

Yrma Lydya Gamboa Jiménez (17 September 1999 – 23 June 2022) was a Mexican singer who specialised in bolero music.

== Career ==
Lydya was recognised for her music by the Mexican Congress in 2019.

== Murder ==
She was murdered in June 2022. Her husband, lawyer, Jesús Hernández Alcocer was charged with her femicide, and he died in October 2022.
