= Francisco Solís Peón =

Mexican politician (1968–2022)

Member of the Legislative Assembly of Mexico City
- In office 16 September 2000 – 15 September 2003
- Preceded by: Virginia Jaramillo Flores
- Succeeded by: Gabriela Cuevas Barron
- Constituency: District 14

Personal details
- Born: Francisco Fernando Solís Peón; 14 July 1968
- Died: 14 March 2022 (aged 53) Mérida, Mexico
- Party: PAN (until 2003)
- Education: Escuela Libre de Derecho

Francisco Fernando Solís Peón (14 July 1968 – 14 March 2022) was a Mexican politician.

== Biography ==
A member of the National Action Party, he served in the Legislative Assembly of Mexico City from 2000 to 2003.

He died of complications from COVID-19 in Mérida on 14 March 2022, at the age of 53.
