= Carlos Bremer =

Mexican businessman (1960–2024)

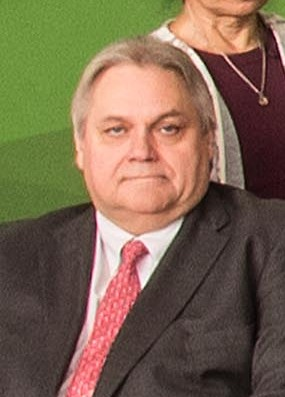
- Born: Carlos Manuel Bremer Gutiérrez; 1 June 1960; Monterrey, Nuevo León, Mexico
- Died: 5 January 2024 (aged 63); San Pedro Garza García, Nuevo León, Mexico
- Occupations: Businessman; Philanthropist
- Spouse: Adriana Ibarra de Bremer

Carlos Manuel Bremer Gutiérrez (1 June 1960 – 5 January 2024) was a Mexican businessman, partner of the conglomerate Grupo Financiero Value, and general director until his death and philanthropist who participated in international foundations and received some national recognitions.

== Early life ==
Bremer was the son of Guillermo Bremer and Sarita Gutiérrez, the fourth of their five children. He had three older brothers, Guillermo, Rodrigo, Bernardo, and a younger brother, Alberto. Bremer's grandfather, Eduardo Bremer, was a German migrant doctor who settled in Matamoros and Brownsville to dedicate himself to the pharmacy business. Bremer studied public accounting at the Monterrey Institute of Technology and Higher Education. In 1986, while in Monterrey, he opened 'Botica del León', one of the family's first steps into the business world. His father, following the paths of his grandfather, opened the Casa Bremer.

== Business career ==
Bremer began his career in the family business, Casa Bremer, which offered diverse ranges of products, from ice cream to sporting goods and pharmaceuticals. At age 12, he began selling pocket calculators to businessmen who were friends of his parents. He acquired these calculators at a cost of 10 or 11 dollars in the United States and resold them in Mexico for 18 dollars. At the age of 14, he started his first significant business organizing trips to Disneyland with his schoolmates. He generated profitability through negotiations with parents and travel agencies. Motivated by the success and profitability of arcades in the United States, Bremer saved money to open his own video game business. However, he faced failure due to the limited ability of the children in his neighborhood. Although he closed the business, he considers this experience crucial, marking him forever with the lesson of always having a contingency plan. Bremer's interest in the financial markets was so strong that by the age of 15 he was already providing investment advice to businessmen friends of his father.

At the age of 19, in September 1979, Bremer joined the Banpaís group brokerage house, which had plans to close operations in December of the same year. Before turning 20, as an investment advisor, he already had 25 clients from whom he charged commissions based on the profits obtained on their investments. Thanks to Bremer's ability to attract customers, the bank not only avoided closure, but recovered and became the city's undisputed leader. In 1985, together with businessman Jorge Lankenau, he founded the Ábaco brokerage house, which was affected by the economic crisis of 1988, leading it to bankruptcy.

In 1993, Bremer founded Grupo Financiero Value, together with Javier Benítez Gómez, a stock brokerage company that brings together Value Casa de Bolsa, Fina Arrenda and Fina Factor. In 2010, he became president of the Board of Directors, which in 2024 was replaced by José Kaún Nader.

== Philanthropy ==
Bremer organized and supported, with his personal initiative, various philanthropy events in Mexico with the strategy of supporting education through sports. He thus promoted events and conferences on entrepreneurship, finance, business, sports and entertainment, in order to transmit values and discipline. He defined himself as a soldier of education and sports.

=== Film and television ===
Bremer participated in the business panel of the television series Shark Tank México, which is co-produced by Sony Pictures Television, SPT Networks and Claro Video from its beginning and during the first 5 seasons of the series. As a member of the original cast he has shared the screen with Mexican businesspeople such as Arturo Elías Ayub, Rodrigo Herrera Aspra, Marcus Dantus, Ana Victoria García, and Jorge Vergara. After leaving, his place was taken by Braulio Arsuaga.

Bremer was also a producer of the film The Perfect Game (2010), which promotes the feat of the Mexican children who won the Little League Baseball world championship in 1957 in Williamsport. He supported the production of the film Campeones (2018), which describes the story of the Mexican team that beat Brazil in the 2007 FIFA U-17 World Cup. He received thanks in the credits of the film Little Boy (2015), due to their support for the producers of the project.

=== Sports ===
Bremer encouraged Mexican sports through an “Escala”, which has produced Olympic-level athletes such as archer Mariana Avitia, bronze medalist in London 2012. He supported the Mexican delegation to the 2019 Pan American Games with 544 athletes. He supported prominent professional athletes such as golfer and world champion Lorena Ochoa, basketball player Eduardo Nájera, racquetball player and world champion Paola Longoria, world champion boxers Juan Manuel Márquez and Canelo Álvarez, and baseball player, Adrián González.

=== Education ===
Bremer participated in the Clinton Foundation where he was part from 2002 to 2017, and as honorary president of the State Consultative Council of Citizen Participation for Education of the state of Nuevo León, coordinating initiatives for the benefit of children and young people in the state.

== Personal life and death ==
Bremer was married to Adriana Ibarra, with whom he had four children, Adriana, Carlos, Paulina and Marcelo. He also became related to the Creel-Terrazas family through a grandson born to his younger daughter Paulina.

On 2 January 2024, Bremer experienced an episode of symptoms that were diagnosed as pre-infarction while he was in his office, which led to his immediate hospitalization. Three days after that, he died on 5 January, at the age of 63, due to cardiac complications.
