= San Luis Potosí Cathedral =

Coordinates: 22.15167°N 100.97529°W

St. Louis the King Cathedral
- Catedral Metropolitana de San Luis Rey
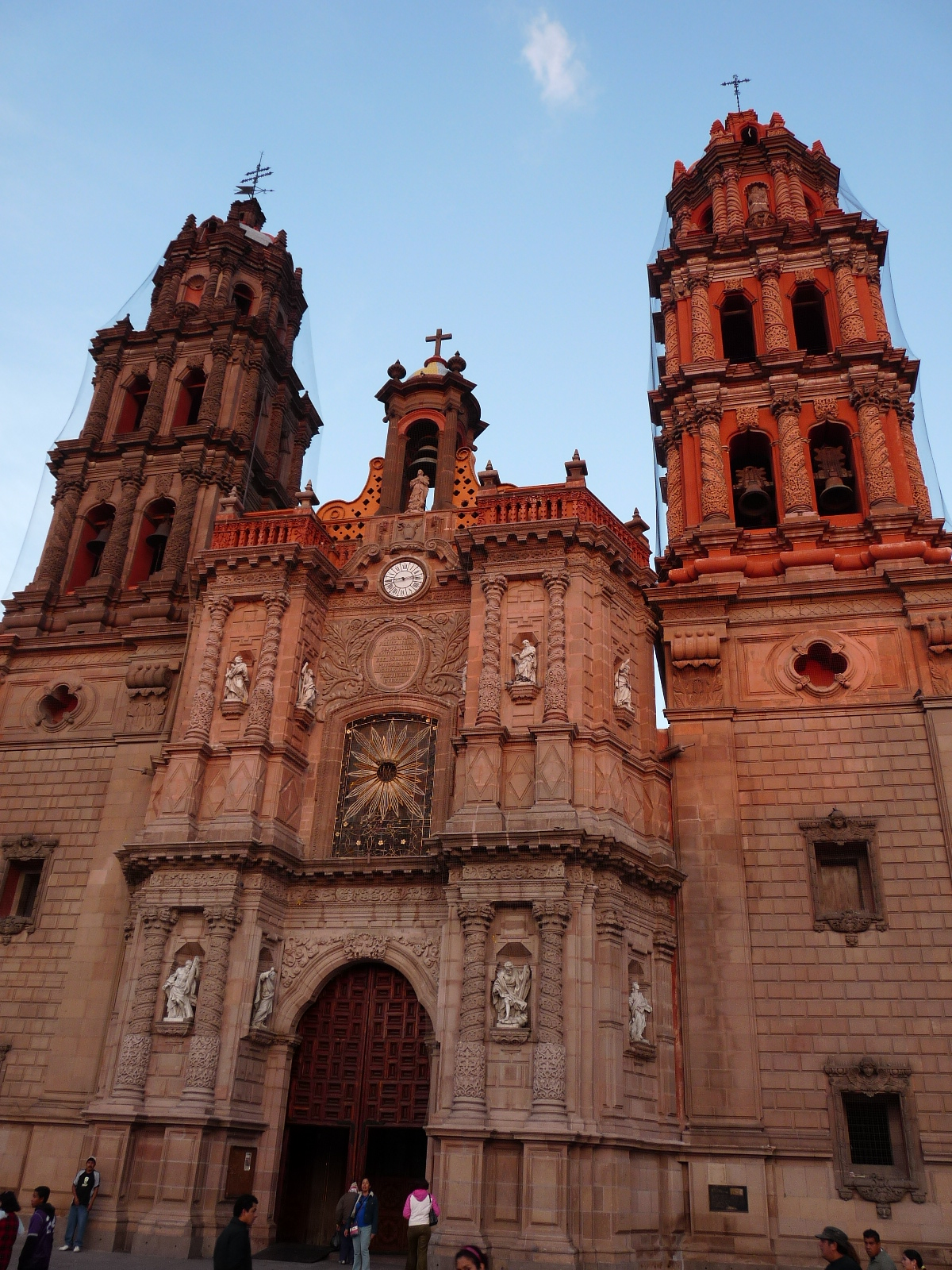
- St. Louis the King Cathedral
- Location: San Luis Potosí
- Country: Mexico
- Denomination: Roman Catholic Church

The St. Louis the King Cathedral (Spanish: Catedral Metropolitana de San Luis Rey) Also San Luis Potosí Cathedral Is a Catholic cathedral that functions as the seat of the archdiocese of San Luis Potosí in Mexico. It is located in the historic center of the state capital, on the eastern side of the main square. The building we currently know was built in 1670 and was completed in 1730. It is a cathedral from 1854. It is dedicated to St. Louis King of France.

It has a Baroque façade designed as a screen, similar to that of the Basilica of Guadalupe in Mexico City, has three sections.

The main altar is composed of a large cypress made of masonry, of two bodies. In the first one is St. Louis King of France, the second shelters the image of Our Lady of the Expectation.

== See also ==
- Roman Catholicism in Mexico
- St. Louis the King
