= Lourdes Maldonado López =

Mexican journalist (1954–2022)

María de Lourdes Maldonado López (11 February 1969 – 23 January 2022) was a Mexican journalist.

== Life and career ==
Maldonado López was born on 11 February 1969 in Gómez Palacio, Durango, and studied economics at the Autonomous University of Baja California. Throughout her career, Maldonado López had worked at several Mexican media outlets including Primer Sistema de Noticias, which is owned by former Baja California Governor Jaime Bonilla.

Maldonado López had been involved in a years-long labor dispute with PSN and Bonilla after suing the company for unfair dismissal and unpaid wages. Maldonado López was asking for more than $20,000 in back pay.

She asked Andrés Manuel López Obrador for protection at a press conference in 2019.

In January 2022, she won a lawsuit. Days later, on 23 January, she was shot and killed in a red Hyundai Atos vehicle in front of her home in Tijuana. She was the third of four journalists killed in Mexico in January 2022, in what was reportedly the most violent month for journalists since 2011.

The killing of Lourdes Maldonado Lopez was condemned by the Director-General of the UNESCO Audrey Azoulay in a press-release published on the 26th of January.
