= La tumba (novel) =

1964 novel by José Agustín

La tumba (transl. The Grave) is a 1964 novel written in Spanish by Mexican author José Agustín. It is a short novel, originally written as a series of tales ("Tedium") in a literary workshop.

Some people considered the novel controversial because it freely touched (and portrayed) topics like abortion and sex, but the writers' community praised it immensely. Despite the narrator's intellectual tone, the book was a huge editorial success, establishing José Agustín as a respected and profitable writer.

The novel was Agustín's first work. A distinguished writer said at the time that he liked it, but that it was "naively pedantic."

== Plot summary ==
Set in Mexico City in the 1960s, the main character, Gabriel Guía, is a teenager holding a somewhat cynical and disenchanted view of life and himself. He has the usual adventures of a Mexican rebellious teen in the 1960s, told in slang and a direct tone. He knows French, loves the good music (clearly references from Wagner's Lohengrin but also Stravinsky, jazz and rock and roll) writes tales and poetry, and makes many references and citations of authors like Arthur Rimbaud and Chekhov, some of his more intellectual friends sharing his interest.

== Beginning of a style ==
The importance of La tumba is that the author invented a new narrative concept, with a different sensitivity, a colloquial, fresh and totally uncensored (for the time) language.

== Characters ==
The main character is Gabriel Guía, a teenage high school student, son of a rich couple in Mexico City. He will meet other characters:

- Dora Castillo, Gabriel's classmate, friend and the cause of various problems and adventures of Gabriel. She is the first girl in the book who has sex with him.
- Jacques Muñiz, head of the modern literary circle, where Gabriel meets some of the people that change his way of life.
- Germaine Giradoux, a girl that becomes Gabriel's girlfriend.
- Laura Guía, Gabriel's cousin. Gabriel gets along with her, but she dies in a car accident after partying with him.
- Elsa Galván, a girl who Gabriel really loves, she becomes his girlfriend, problems arising from their relationship lead to the climactic end of the novel.

Other characters: Martín, Carlos, Gilberto, David, Vicky and Rosaura San Román, Jaime Valle, among others, including the parents of the protagonist Gabriel Guía.
