= José Agustín =

Mexican novelist (1944–2024)

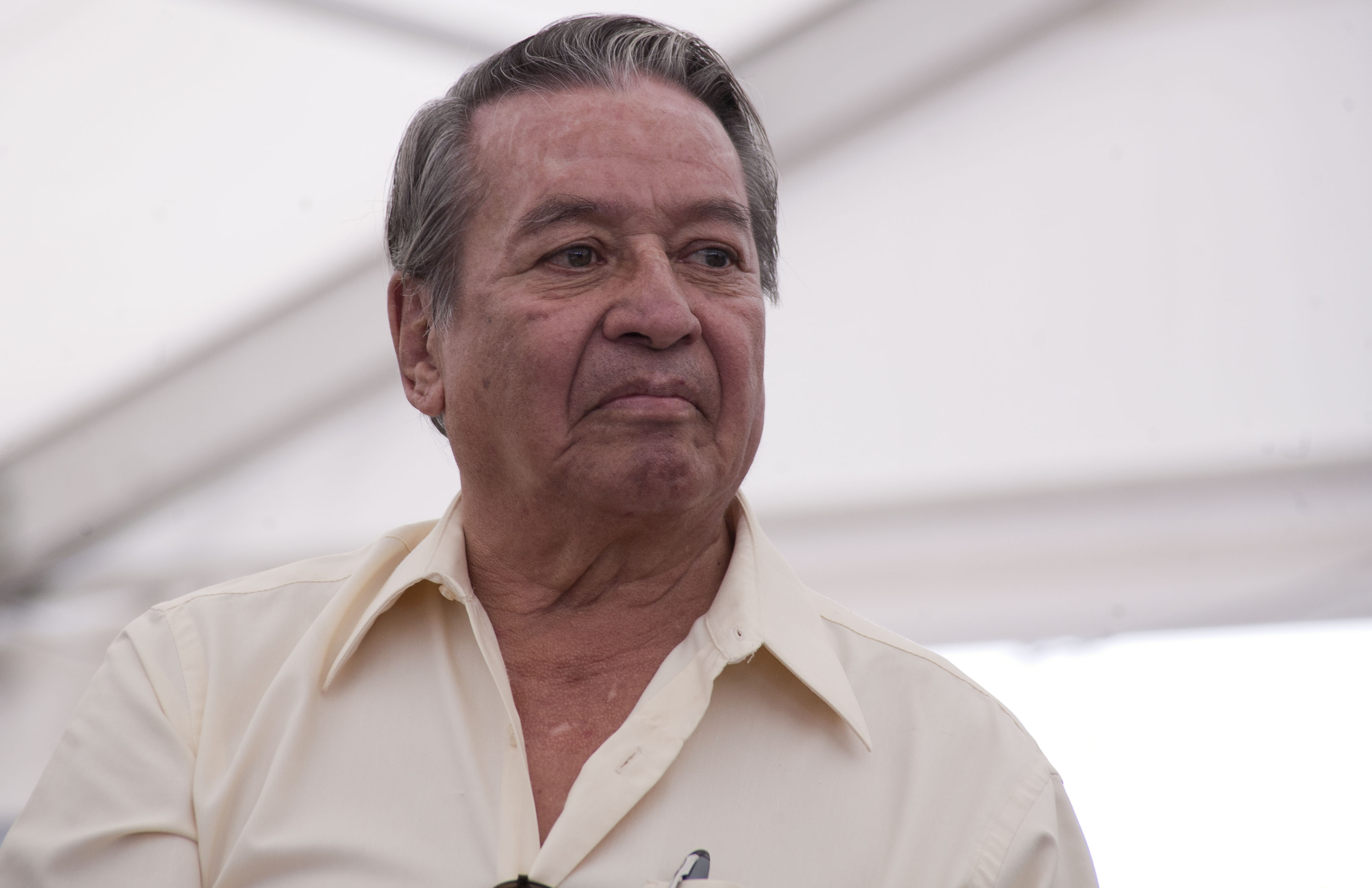
- José Agustín in 2013
- Born: José Agustín Ramírez Gómez; 19 August 1944; Acapulco, Guerrero, Mexico
- Died: 16 January 2024 (aged 79); Cuautla, Morelos, Mexico
- Occupations: Novelist; writer; essayist; screenwriter
- Writing career
- Period: 1964–2024
- Notable works: La Tumba (1964); De Perfil (1966)
- Movement: La Onda

José Agustín Ramírez Gómez (19 August 1944 – 16 January 2024) was a Mexican novelist, short story writer, essayist and screenwriter. Publishing under the pen name José Agustín, he is considered one of the most influential and prolific Mexican writers of the second half of the 20th century.

== Life and career ==
José Agustín was born in Acapulco, Guerrero, on 19 August 1944. He studied classical literature at the School of Philosophy and Letters of the National Autonomous University of Mexico (UNAM), film direction at the Centro Universitario de Estudios Cinematográficos (CUEC) and dramaturgy at the Instituto Nacional de Bellas Artes y Literatura (INBA).

Agustín participated in Juan José Arreola's writers' workshop from 1962 to 1965, where he wrote his first novel, La tumba ("The Tomb"), when he was nineteen years old. The novel was the brief but provocative story of a Mexican upper-class teen, deemed indecent by the public but gathering praise from older writers. This and his most famous work, De perfil ("Profile View"), a fast and detailed view of three days in the main character's life, show stylistic similarities to James Joyce's work, especially A Portrait of the Artist as a Young Man.

Agustín was considered a member of the so-called Onda literature, onda (wave) being slang for current and fashionable views in the eyes of young people.

A common technique in his work is mixing a character's speech with narrative, without making any kind of distinction (free indirect discourse). Thus the reader finds a long dialogue written in a single sentence, and is expected to realize which character is speaking as he reads the words. He also made use of the stream of consciousness technique.

Agustín taught at the University of Denver, the University of California, Irvine, and the University of New Mexico.

Agustín died in Cuautla, Morelos, on 16 January 2024, at the age of 79.

== Awards ==
- 1977: Guggenheim Fellowship
- 1993: Premio Nacional de Literatura Juan Ruiz de Alarcón
- 2011: Premio Nacional de Ciencias y Artes

== Published works ==
=== Novels ===
- La tumba (1964) ISBN 9786073103763
- De perfil (1966) ISBN 9786073121576
- Abolición de la propiedad (1969) ISBN 9786073113298
- Se está haciendo tarde (1973) ISBN 9786073820769
- El rey se acerca a su templo (1978) ISBN 9789708101196
- Ciudades desiertas (1982) ISBN 9786073817257
- Cerca del fuego (1986) ISBN 9789707805224
- La panza del Tepozteco (1992) ISBN 9786073820899
- Dos horas de sol (1994) ISBN 9789707805057
- Vida con mi viuda (2004) ISBN 9786073817196
- Armablanca (2006) ISBN 9786073829731

=== Short stories ===
- Inventando que sueño (1968)
- La mirada en el centro (1977)
- No hay censura (1988)
- No pases esta puerta (1992)
- La miel derramada (1992)

=== Plays ===
- Círculo vicioso (1974) ISBN 978-9682702839

(Vicious Circle (2021), tr. Eric W. Vogt. ISBN 978-9403638263)

=== Essays ===
- La nueva música clásica (1968)
- Literature and censorship in Latin America Today: Dream within a dream (1978)
- Tragicomedia Mexicana: La vida en Mexico de 1940 a 1970. Tomo 1 (1990)
- Tragicomedia Mexicana: La vida en Mexico de 1970 a 1982. Tomo 2 (1992)
- Tragicomedia Mexicana: La vida en Mexico de 1982 a 1994. Tomo 3 (2007)
- Camas de campo, campos de batalla (1994)
- La Contracultura en Mexico (1996)
- El hotel de los corazones solitarios (1996)
- Los grandes discos de rock 1951-1975 (1996)

=== Chronicles ===
- Contra la corriente (1991)

=== Autobiography ===
- Quién soy, dónde estoy, qué me dieron (1966)
- El rock de la cárcel (1986)
- Diario de brigadista: Cuba 1961 (2011)

=== Translations ===
- Cabot Wright comienza (James Purdy: Cabot Wright Begins), 1969.
- Alucinógenos y cultura (Peter T. Furst: Hallucinogens and Culture), 1981.
- Paraíso infernal (Ronald G. Walker: Infernal Paradise: Mexico and the Modern English Novel), 1982.
- El don del águila (Carlos Castaneda: The Eagle's Gift), 1986.
- El viejo y el mar (Ernest Hemingway: The Old Man and the Sea), 1986.

== Filmography ==
- 5 de chocolate y 1 de fresa (1968)
- Luz externa (1974)
- El año de la peste (1979)
- El apando (1976)
- La viuda de Montiel (1979)

== In popular culture ==
The Mexican band Belafonte Sensacional wrote the song "Epic Aris" inspired by the literary works of José Agustín and Parménides García Saldaña, another writer who was considered a member of La Onda literature.

== See also ==
- List of people from Morelos
