= Secretariat of Anticorruption and Good Governance =

Cabinet agency of Mexico

Coordinates: 19.3612°N 99.1838°W

Official logo

The Secretariat of Anticorruption and Good Governance (Spanish: Secretaría Anticorrupción y del Buen Gobierno, SABG) is one of the twenty-one state secretariats in charge of coordinating, assessing and monitoring the public exercise of the federal government. It was created in 1982 as the Secretariat of the Comptroller General of the Federation and was known as the Secretary of Accounting and Administrative Development from 1994 to 2003, when it was reconstituted once more as the Secretariat of the Civil Service.

After years of inactivity because of the failure to allocate a secretary by the incoming government of Enrique Peña Nieto, the Secretariat was reactivated on February 3, 2015, and said president appointed Virgilio Andrade Martínez as his secretary. During the presidency of Andrés Manuel López Obrador, the secretariat was renamed the Secretariat of Anticorruption and Good Governance; Raquel Buenrostro Sánchez became the head of the SABG in October 2024.
