= Parish of la Santa Cruz, Puebla =

Coordinates: 19.0461°N 98.1878°W

Parish of la Santa Cruz
- Church of la Cruz
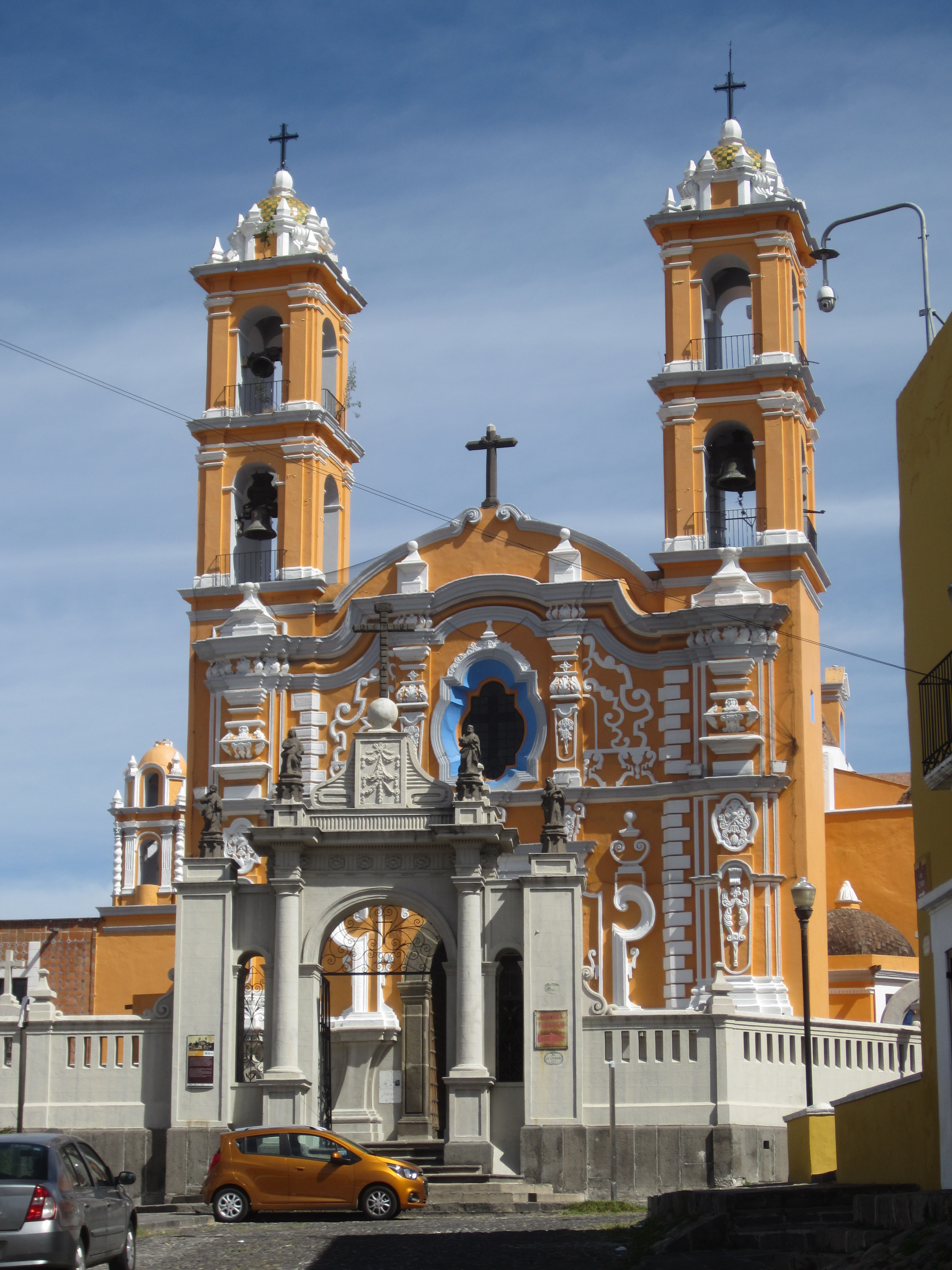
- The church's exterior, 2018

- Location within Puebla (state) Location within Mexico
- Location: Puebla
- Country: Mexico

The Parish of la Santa Cruz, or Church of la Cruz, is a church in the city of Puebla, in the Mexican state of Puebla.

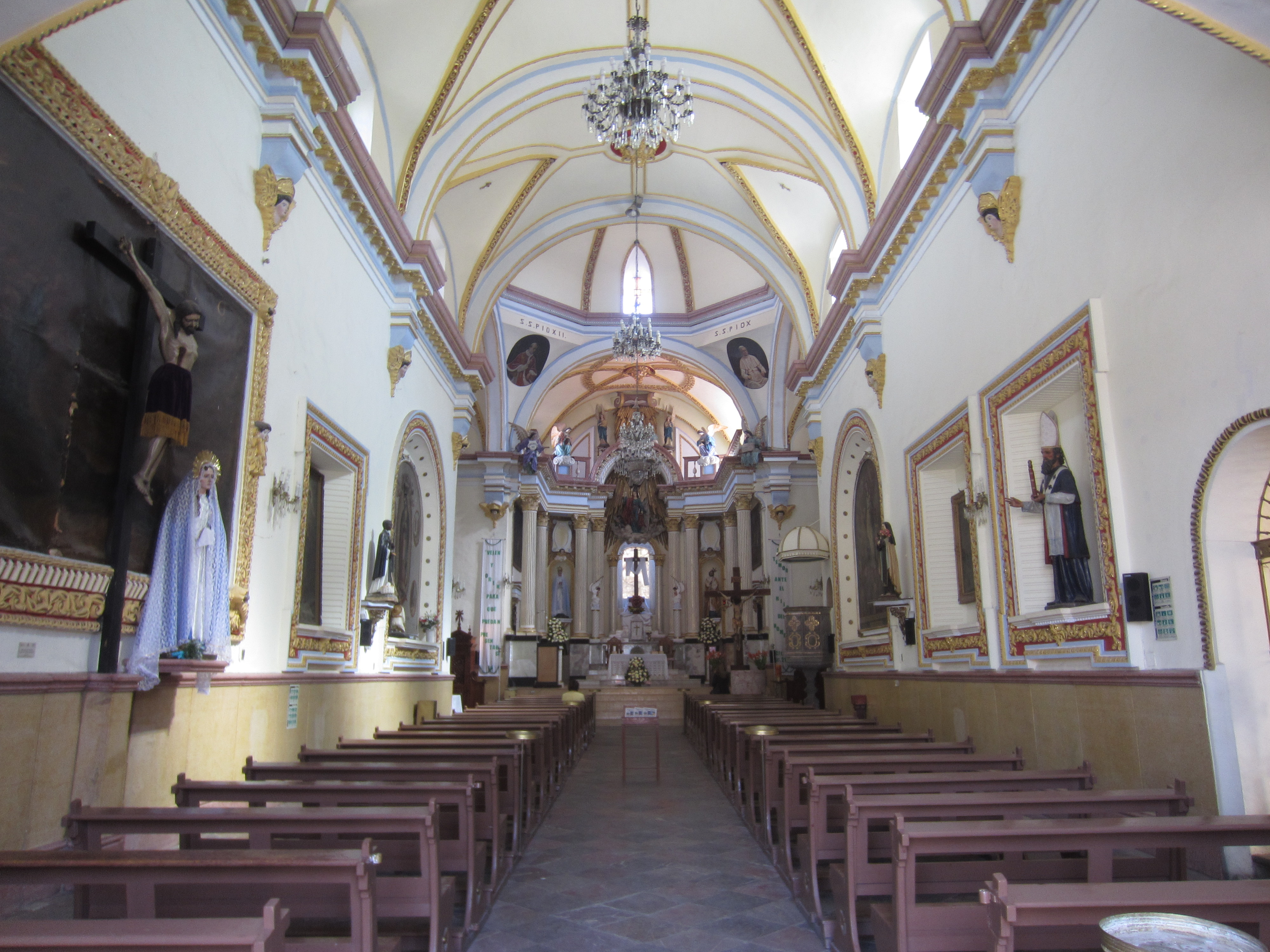
Interior, 2018
