= Penitentiary (disambiguation) =

Prison or penitentiary, is a correctional facility. In the U.S., see separate articles for 'State Prisons' and 'Federal Penitentiaries.'

Penitentiary may also refer to:

- Apostolic Penitentiary, a tribunal of mercy, responsible for issues relating to the forgiveness of sins in the Roman Catholic Church
- canon penitentiary, a clergyman attached to a major church to serve as a general confessor
- Penitentiary (1938 film)
- Penitentiary (1979 film)
- Penitentiary Point, a cliff in Utah
