= Tritschler =

Tritschler is a surname of German origin. Notable people with the name include:

- Guillermo Tritschler y Córdova (1878-1952), Mexican prelate of the Catholic Church
- Karl-Heinz Tritschler (born 1949), German football referee
- Martin Tritschler (1814-1894), German manufacturer and retailer of clocks
- Sven Tritschler (born 1981), German politician (AfD)
- Tritschler brothers, American gymnasts
