= List of glaciers in Mexico =

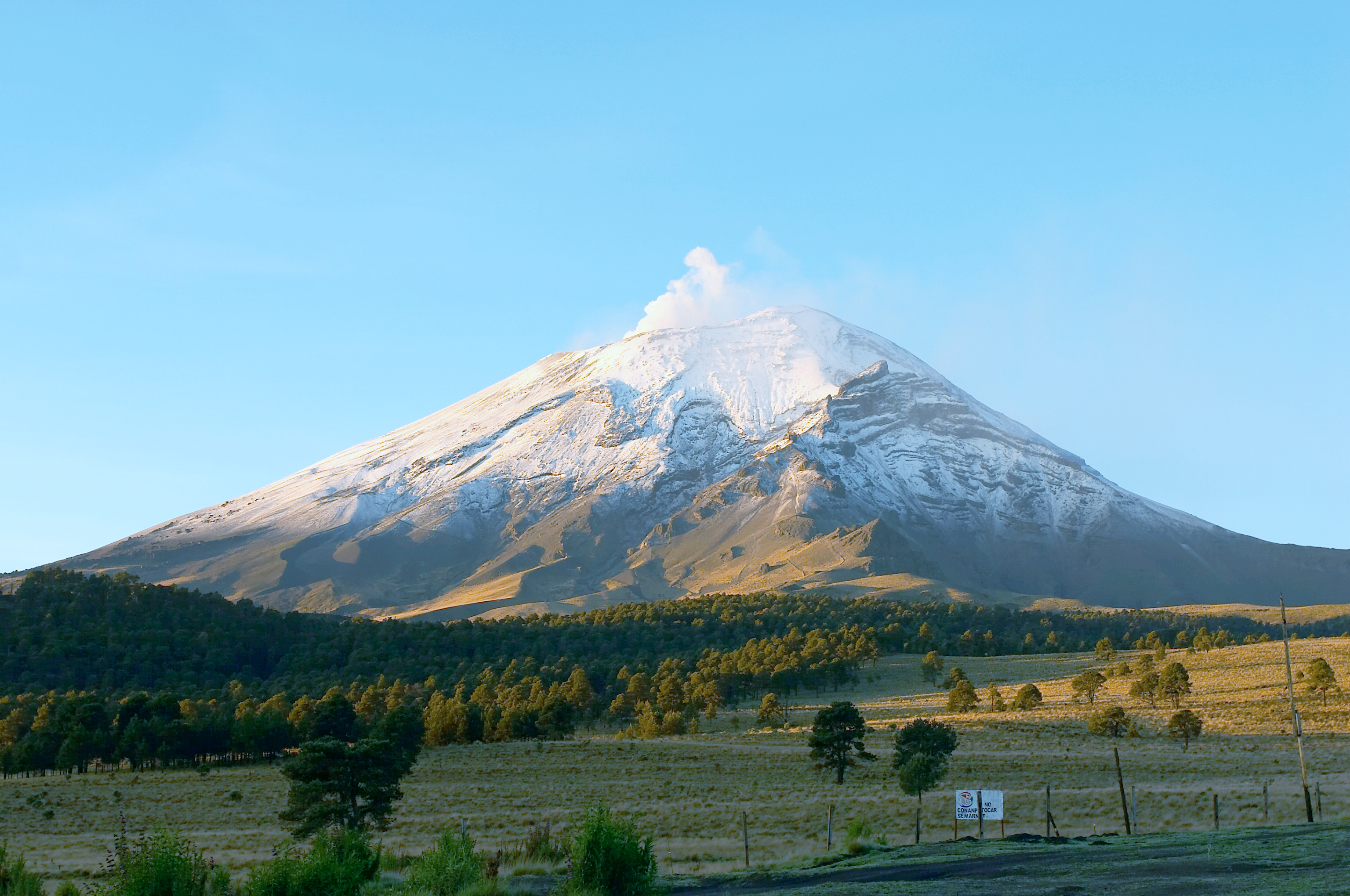
Ashes and snow at Mexico's Popocatépetl.

Mexico has about two dozen glaciers, all of which are located on Pico de Orizaba (Citlaltépetl), Popocatépetl and Iztaccíhuatl, the three tallest mountains in the country.

== Puebla / Mexico State ==
Popocatépetl

- Glaciar del Ventorrillo
- Glaciar Norte (Popocatépetl)
- Glaciar Noroccidental

Iztaccíhuatl

- Glaciar de la Cabeza
- Glaciar del Cuello
- Glaciar de Ayolotepito
- Glacier Norte (Iztaccíhuatl)
- Glaciar del Cráter
- Glaciar Oestenoroeste
- Glaciar Nororiental
- Glaciar Centro Oriental
- Glaciar de Ayoloco
- Glaciar Sudoriental
- Glaciar Atzintli
- Glaciar de San Agustín

== Veracruz ==
Pico de Orizaba or Citlaltépetl

- Gran Glaciar Norte, a small icecap with 7 outlet lobes including:
  - Lengua del Chichimeco
  - Glaciar de Jamapa
  - Glaciar del Toro
  - Glaciar de la Barba
  - Glaciar Noroccidental
  - Glaciar Occidental
  - Glaciar Suroccidental
  - and one disconnected niche glacier:
  - Glaciar Oriental
