= Orizaba River =

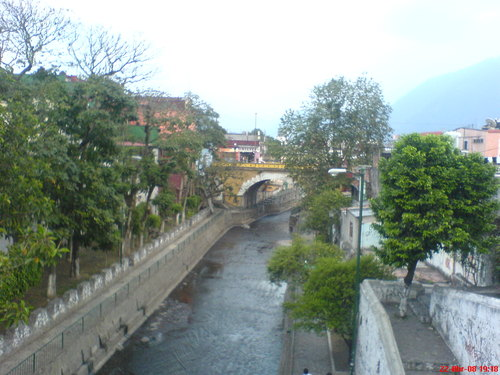

Location
- Country: Mexico

Physical characteristics
- Mouth
  - location: Río Blanco
  - coordinates: 18°50′6″N 97°5′27″E

The Orizaba River (Spanish: Río Orizaba) is a river that flows through the city Orizaba in the Mexican state of Veracruz. It is a tributary of the Río Blanco that crosses southern Orizaba.

== The river ==
The Orizaba River originates from a small spring called Ojo de Venado at the foot of the Citlaltépetl. It flows partly underground and unites with some small streams that emerge on both sides of its course. West of the Calle Madero it crosses the city of Orizaba from north to south and flows at La Junta in the Río Blanco.

== Bridges ==
To connect the western city area with the eastern city area, a series of bridges were built, which gave the city of Orizaba its nickname "La señora de los puentes" ("The Woman of the Bridges"). Two of the oldest and best-known bridges are the "Puente La borda", which leads the main thoroughfare "Avenida Poniente 7" across the river, and the "Puente La beneficencia" already built in 1838.

== Animal enclosure ==
In order to make the river area, the city and the region even more attractive for tourism, animal enclosures have been established in the river region, which include monkeys, jaguars, roe deer and raccoons. At the end of May 2013, the area was extended by a reptile enclosure.

== Weather ==
Although most of the city's residential areas are well above the river level, heavy rainfall occasionally causes flooding that affects the lower-lying urban areas (most notably the "Avenida Poniente 18").
