= Glaciar Norte (Popocatépetl) =

Glacier in Mexico

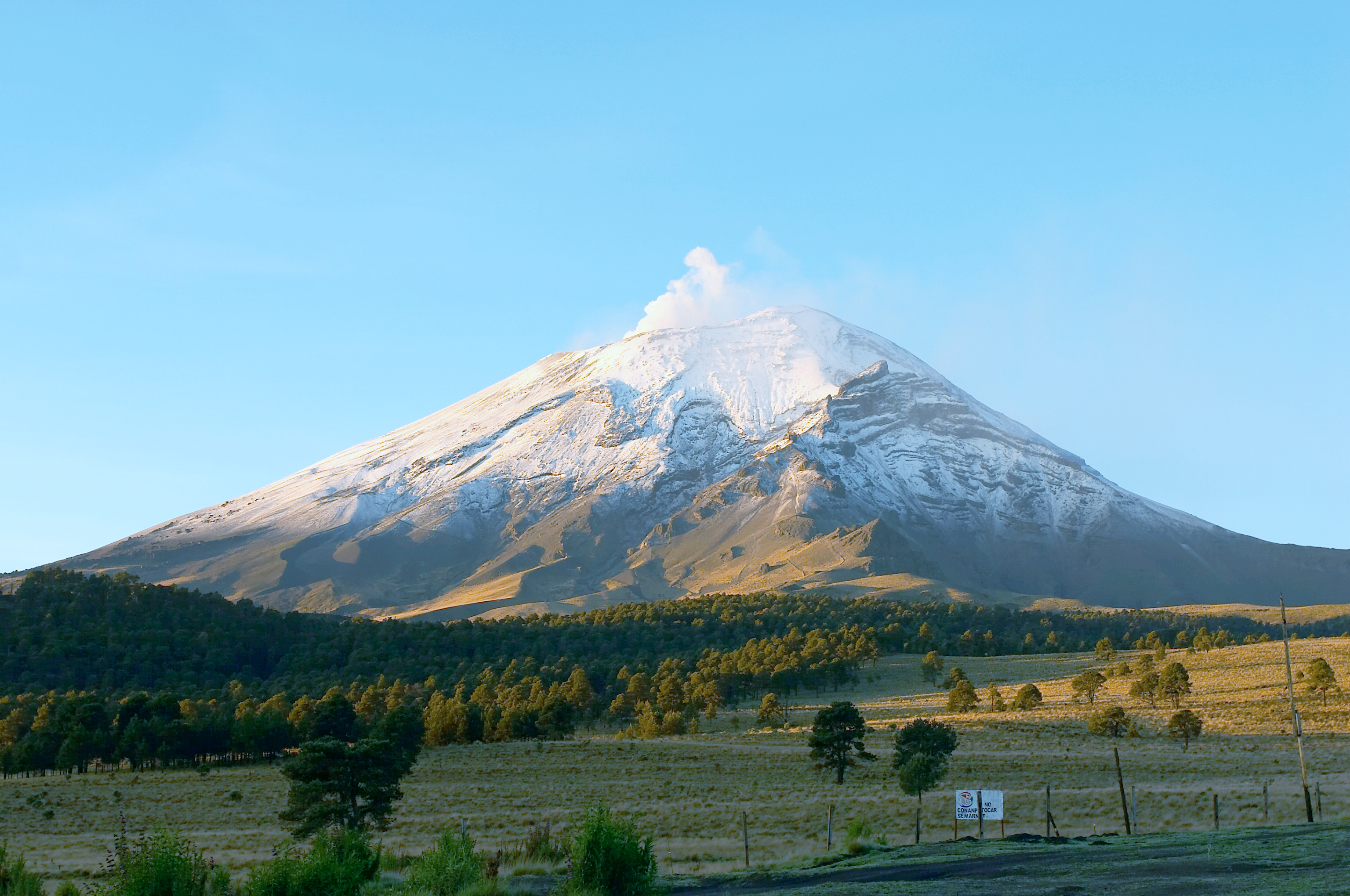
- Popocatépetl in June 2006
- Interactive map of Glaciar Norte
- Type: Mountain glacier
- Location: Popocatépetl, in the Mexican State of Puebla
- Coordinates: 19°01′45″N 98°37′23″W
- Area: 0.0 km^{2} (0 sq mi)
- Length: 0 m (0 ft)
- Status: Retreating

Glaciar Norte was a glacier located on the volcanic peak of Popocatépetl in the Mexican State of Puebla. In 1964, the glacier was estimated to be 600 metres (2,000 ft) long and cover 0.2 square kilometres (0.077 sq mi) on the north side of Popocatépetl. Glaciar Norte is connected to Glaciar del Ventorrillo, which lies to the west. In a study published in 2006, all the glaciers atop Popocatépetl had essentially disappeared due to increased volcanic activity. In the 1990s, the glaciers greatly decreased in size, partly due to warmer temperatures but largely due to increased volcanic activity. By early 2001, Popocatepetl's glaciers had become extinct; ice remained on the volcano, but no longer displayed the characteristic features of glaciers such as crevasses.

== Retreating ==
Glacier retreating

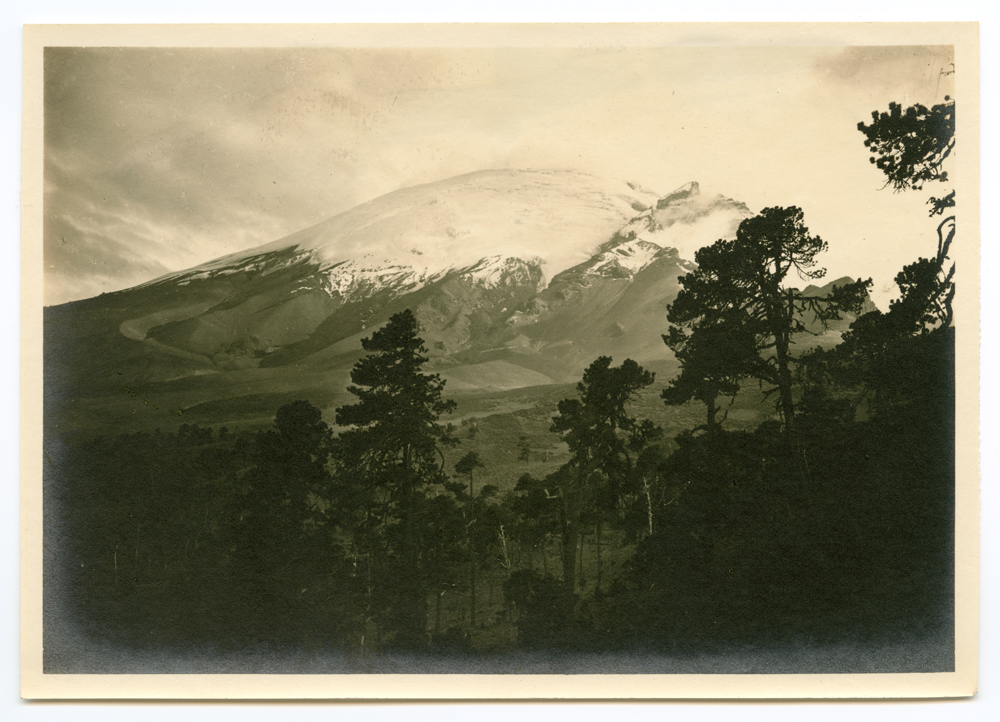
1908-1915: View of the ice cap seen from the Paso de Cortés, note the great extension.

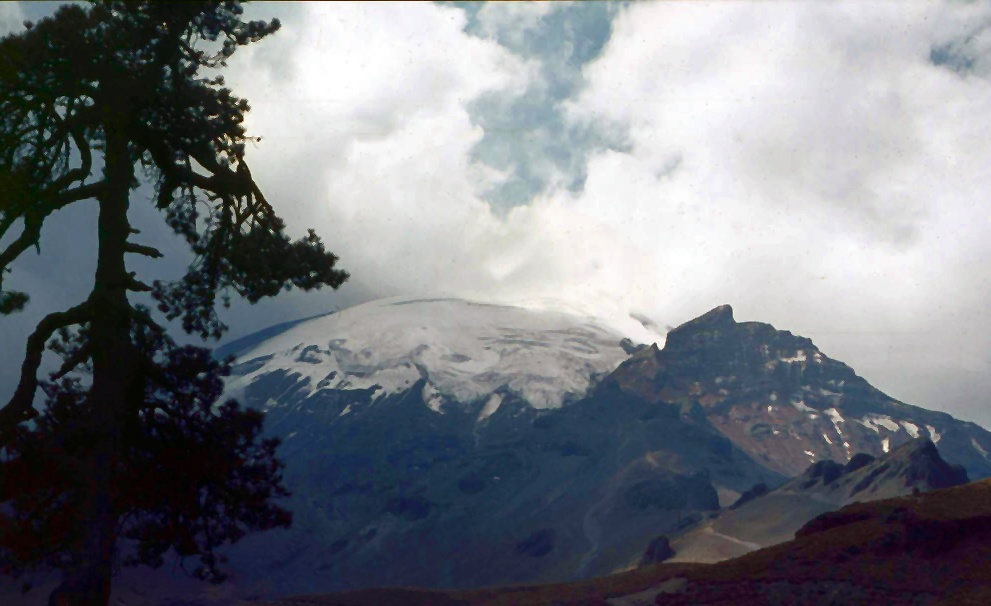
March 1981: View of the ice cap seen from the same location, note the retreat of the cap, the crevasses, fracture zones and cracks on the glaciers.

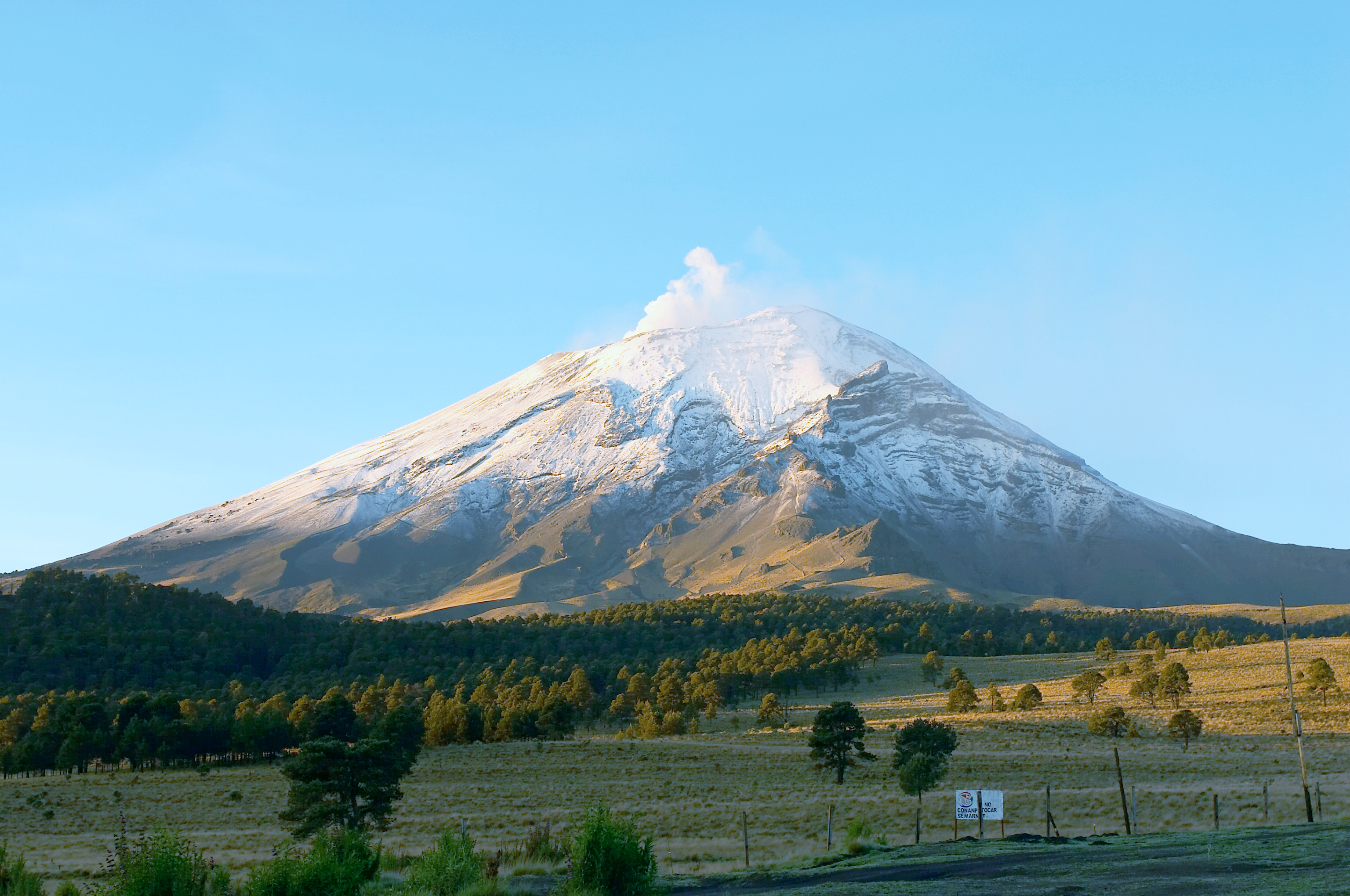
June 2006: View of the glaciers, the glacial retreat is evident.

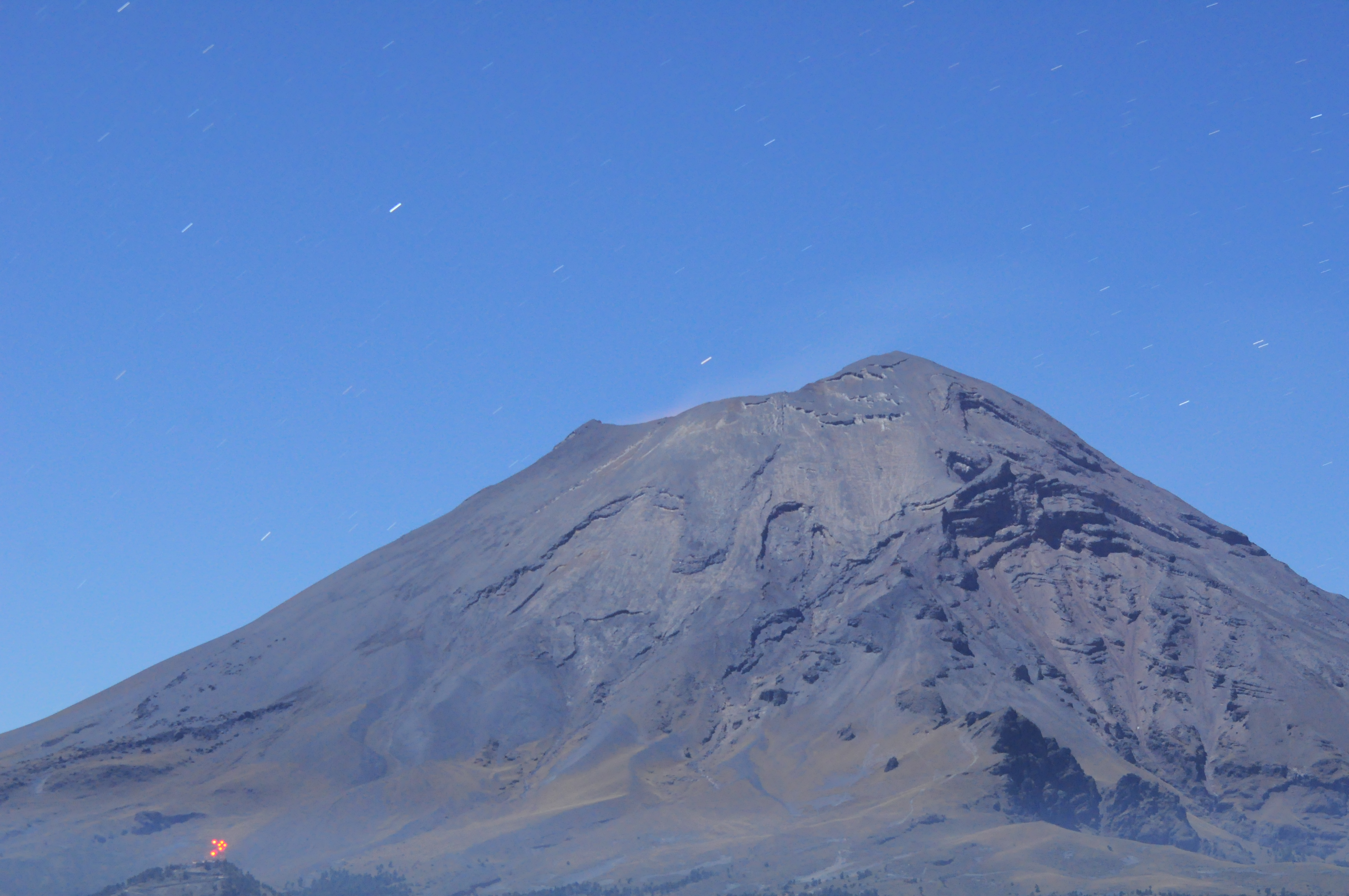
December 2014 View of the glacier seen from one of the slopes of Iztaccihuatl, the black coloration of the glaciers and the snow is caused by the constant fumaroles of the volcano previous months.

== See also ==
- List of glaciers in Mexico
