= Gran Glaciar Norte =

Glacier

- Snow cover on Pico de Orizaba
- Interactive map of Gran Glaciar Norte
- Type: Mountain glacier
- Location: Mexico
- Coordinates: 19°02′00″N 97°16′03″W
- Area: 9.08 km^{2} (3.51 sq mi)
- Status: Retreating

Gran Glaciar Norte is the largest ice cap and firn field in México. It is located on Pico de Orizaba (Volcán Citlaltépetl) (5,636 metres (18,491 ft)) which is the highest point in Mexico. It contains nine named glaciers, including seven outlet glaciers, and a mountain niche glacier. The elevation of these glaciers range from near 5,610 m (18,410 ft) to 4,700 m (15,400 ft).

| Glacier Name | Glacier type | Area (Square kilometers) |
|---|---|---|
| Gran Glacier Norte | Ice Cap/firn field | 9.08 |
| Lengua del Chichimeco | Outlet | - |
| Glaciar de Jamapa | Outlet | - |
| Glaciar del toro | Outlet | - |
| Glaciar de la barbara | Outlet | - |
| Glaciar Noroccidental | Outlet | - |
| Glaciar Occidental | Outlet | - |
| Glaciar Oriental | Mountain (niche) | 0.42 |

== See also ==
- List of glaciers in Mexico
