= Guillermo Tritschler y Córdova =

Mexican prelate

The Most Reverend Guillermo Tritschler y Córdova Servant of God
- Archbishop of Monterrey
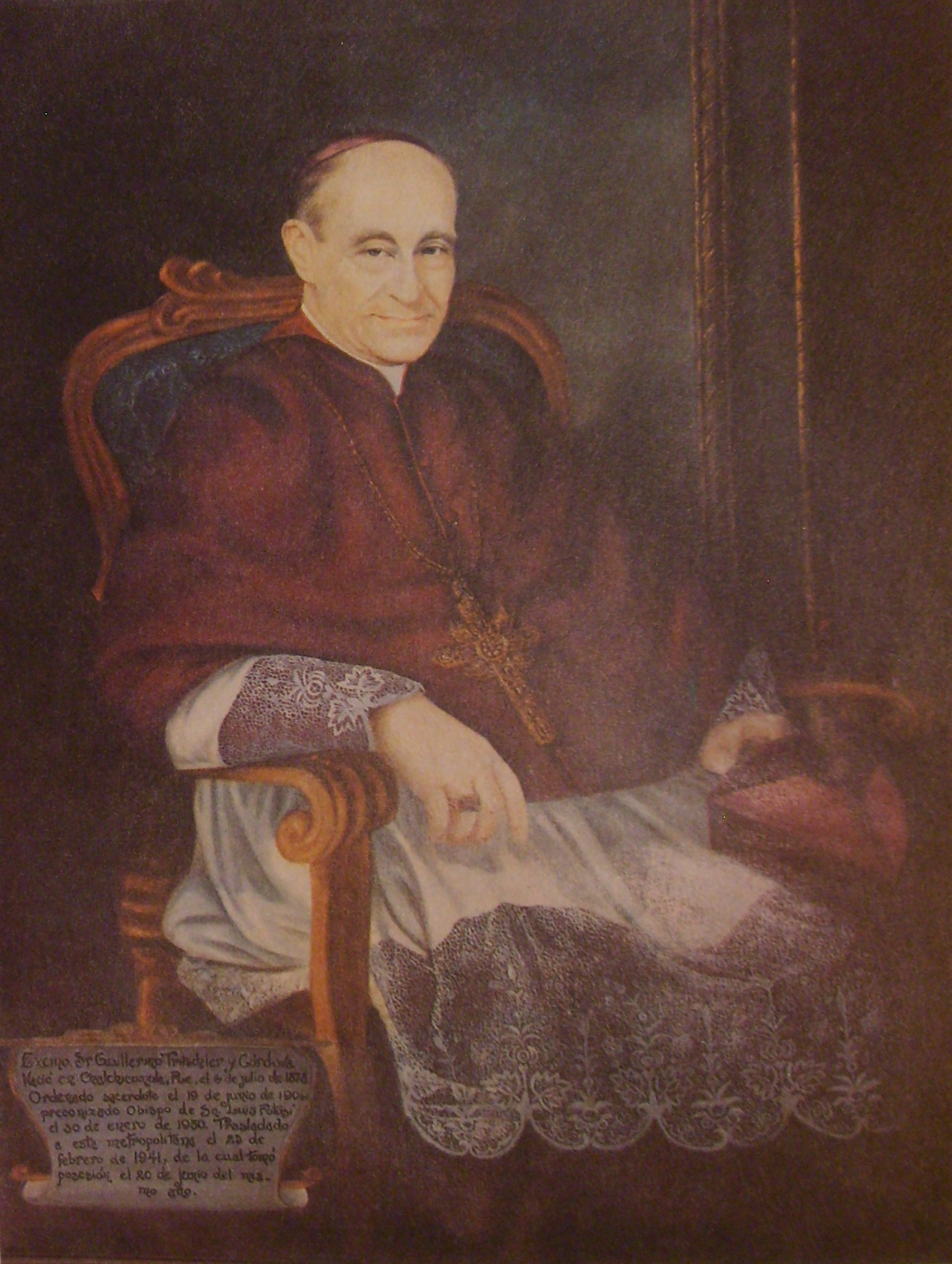
- Church: Roman Catholic Church
- See: San Luis Potosí (1931–1941); Monterrey (1941–1952)
- Appointed: 22 February 1941
- Term ended: 29 July 1952

Orders
- Ordination: 19 July 1904 by Bishop Martín Tritrschler y Córdova
- Consecration: 22 April 1931 by Archbishop Martín Tritrschler y Córdova; Co: Bishop Manuel Fulcheri y Pietrasanta; Bishop Luis María Altamirano y Bulnes

Personal details
- Born: 6 July 1878 San Andrés Chalchicomula, Puebla, Mexico
- Died: 29 July 1952 (age 74) Monterrey, Nuevo León, Mexico
- Buried: Metropolitan Cathedral of Our Lady of Monterrey
- Parents: Martin Tritschler & Rosa Maria Córdova y Puig
- Education: Collegio Pio-Latino-Americano Pontificio; Pontifical Gregorian University (Ph.D., Th.D., JCD)
- Motto: Crescamus in Illo per omnia (May we grow in Him through all things)
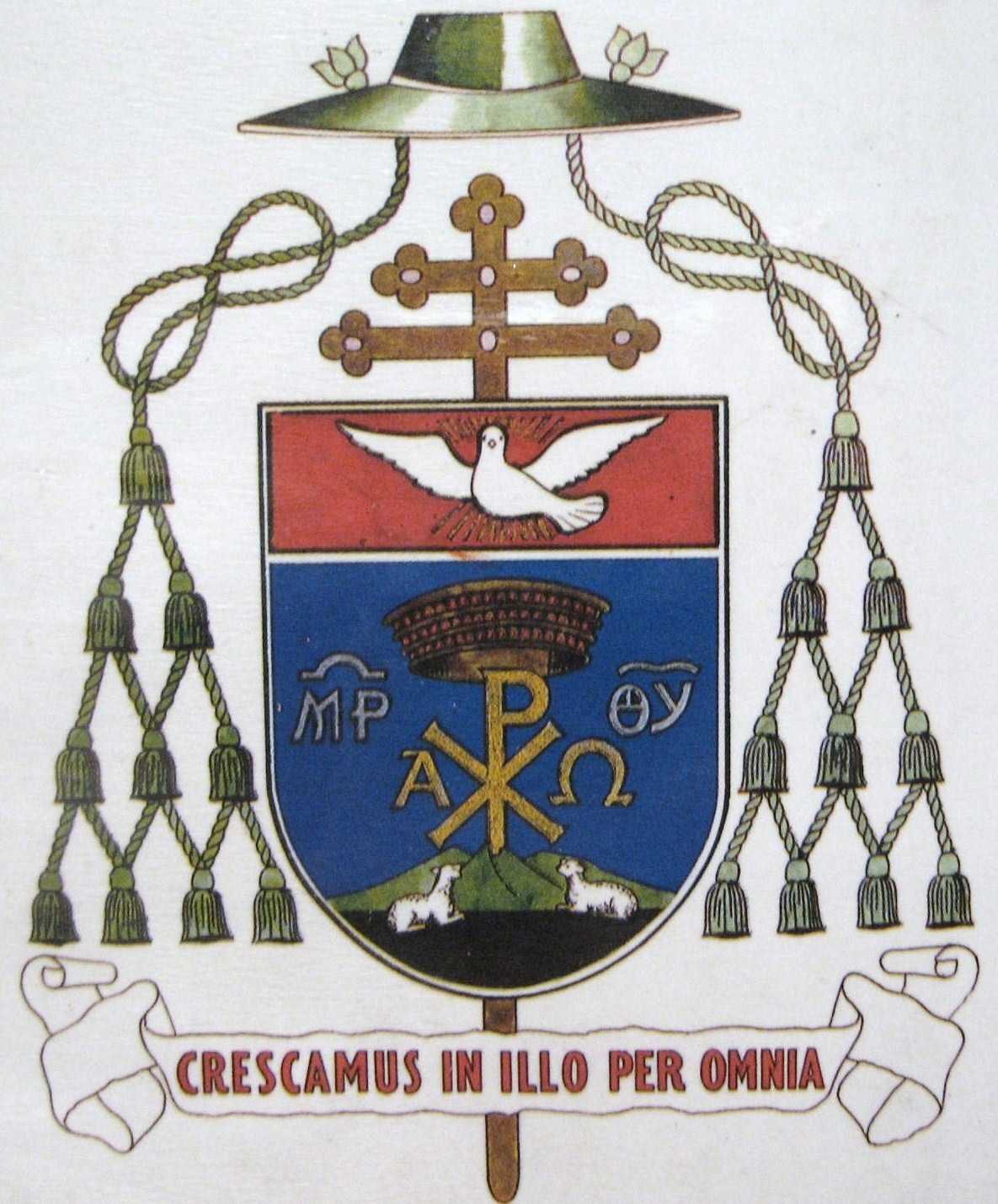
- Coat of arms

Guillermo Tritschler y Córdova (6 July 1878 – 29 July 1952) was a Mexican prelate of the Catholic Church.

Born in 1878 to the German-born Martin Tritschler and Rosa Córdova, he was raised mostly by his uncle, who sent him to study at the Colegio Pio-Latino-Americano Pontificio and Pontifical Gregorian University in Rome. He was ordained in 1904 and served as a seminary professor and later Canon Penitentiary of the Mexico City Metropolitan Cathedral. In 1931 he was appointed Archbishop of San Luis Potosí, where he served until 1941, when he was appointed Archbishop of Monterrey. He served in that position until his death on 29 July 1952.

His cause for canonization is open and the Congregation for the Causes of Saints recently conferred on him the title of Servant of God.

== Biography ==
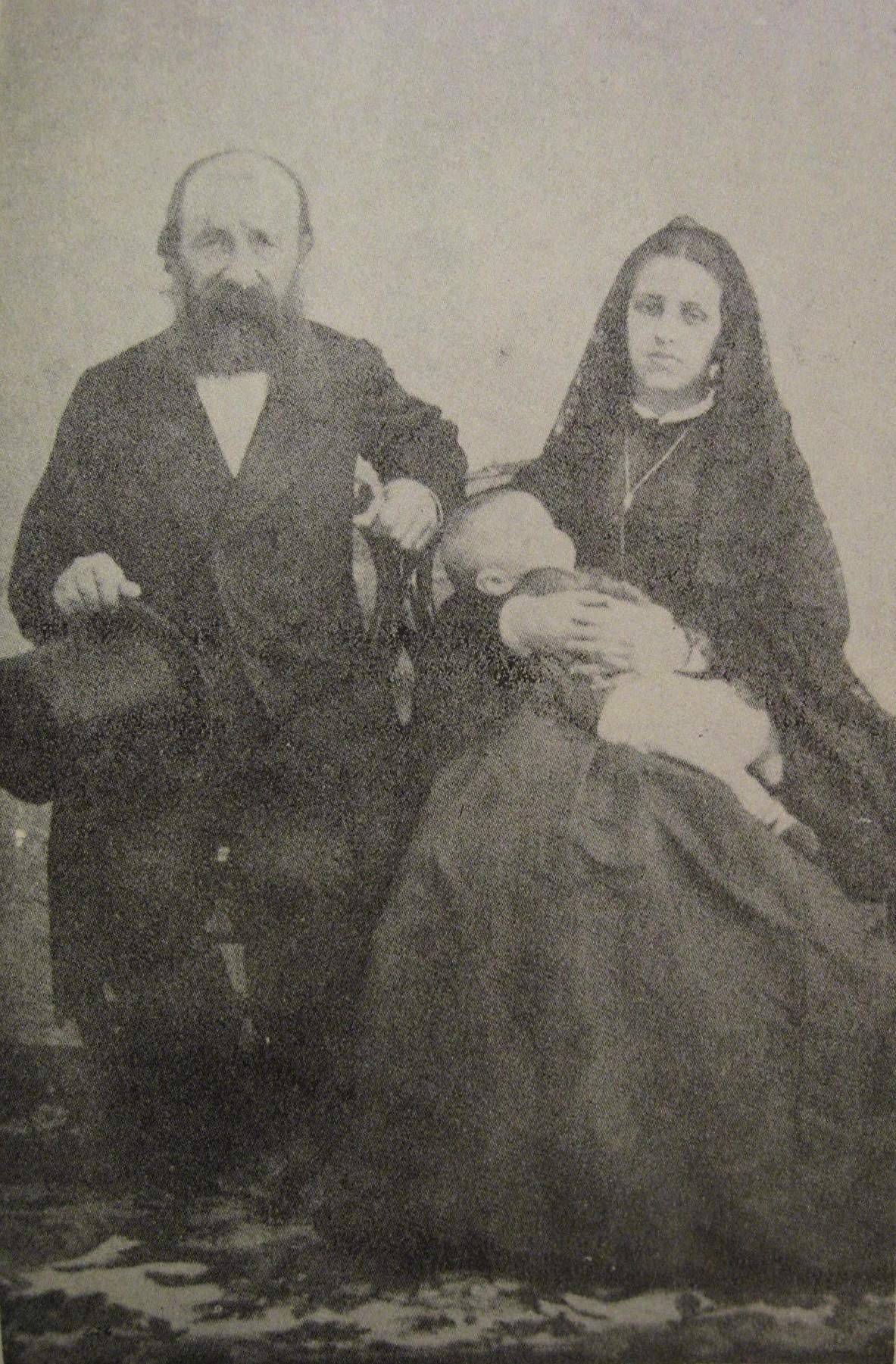
Guillermo as an infant, with his father Martin and mother Rosa.

=== Early life and family ===
Tritschler was born on 6 July 1878 in San Andrés Chalchicomula, Puebla, Mexico. He was baptized, received his First Communion, and was confirmed in the same parish church of that town.

His father, Martin Tritschler, grew up on a farm in Schwärzenbach, Germany, in what was then a region of the Duchy of Württemberg. His father came from an old family of German farmers, whose roots date back to the earliest settlements in the Black Forest, and who were feudal servants of the monasteries of Friedenweiler, Reichenau Island, and Saint Gall. His paternal ancestors first moved into the area in 1437, and settled an area called Ebenemooshof. His father was forced to leave the farm due to primogeniture laws, and he moved to Mexico where he became a prosperous clock manufacturer and retailer.

His mother, Rosa Maria Córdova y Puig (1843–1881), was the daughter of Spanish immigrants to a newly independent Mexico. Rosa's father was Lieutenant Joaquín de Córdova y García, a former member of the Spanish Royal Army who, like many others, defected to join the fledgling Army of the Three Guarantees.

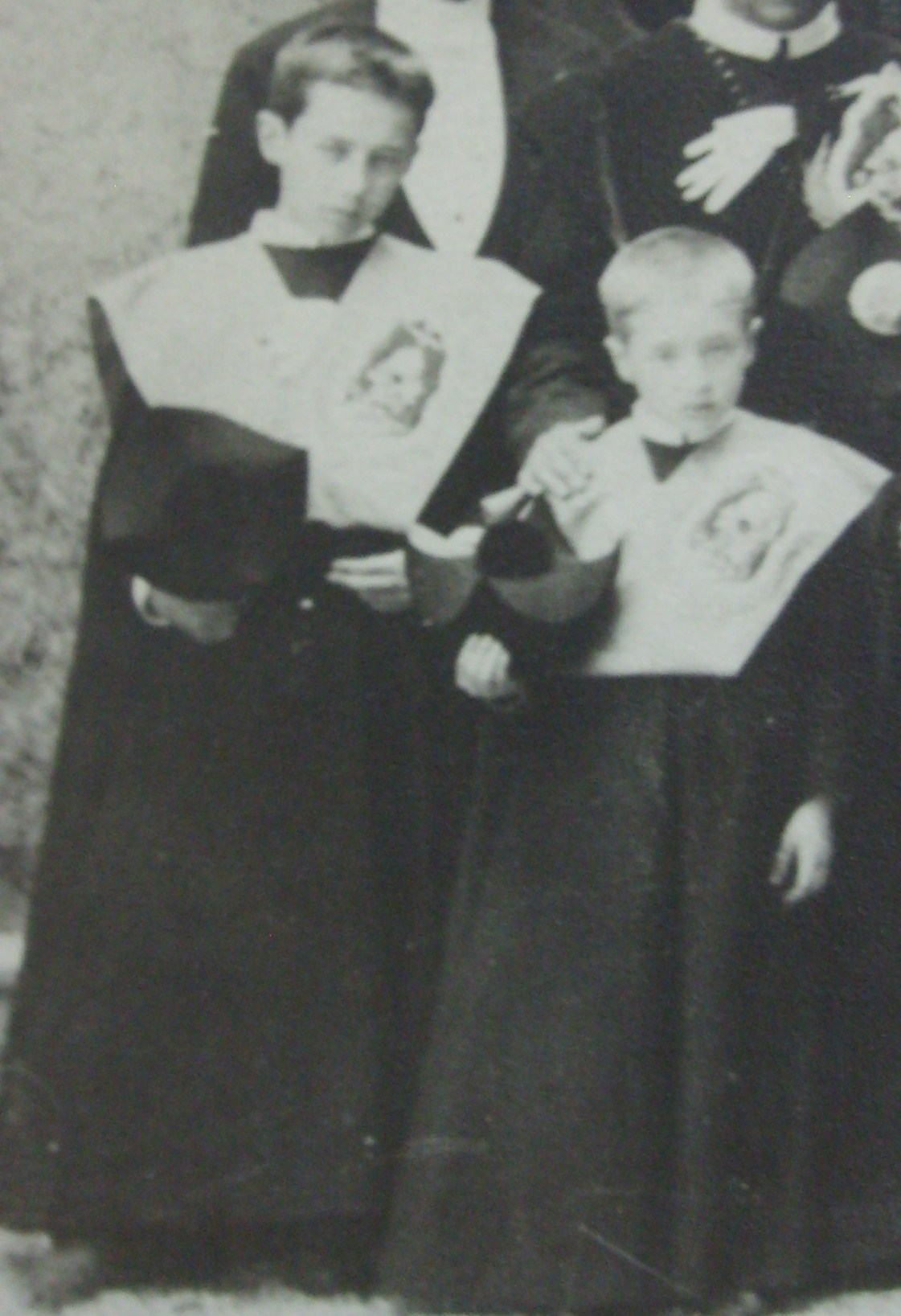
Alfonso (left) and Guillermo (right) Tritschler as children.

The youngest of eight children, Tritschler's brother Martín, the oldest of the eight, entered the priesthood and in 1900 was consecrated Bishop of the Diocese of Yucatán, was elevated to archbishop in 1907, serving until his death in 1942. The second oldest of his siblings, Joaquín, became manager of the estates of Sebastian B. de Mier, a Mexican businessman and diplomat. His sister Rosa Maria joined Religious Servants of the Sacred Heart of Jesus and of the Poor, a young religious order founded by José Maria de Yermo y Parres, and she went on to become Mother Superior of the order. His sixth oldest sibling, Alfonso, graduated from the Pontifical Gregorian University in Rome but decided not to become a priest, and pursued a career in architecture. His three other siblings died in childhood.

Tritschler's mother died when he was three years old, and his father died in 1894, when he was 16.

=== Education ===
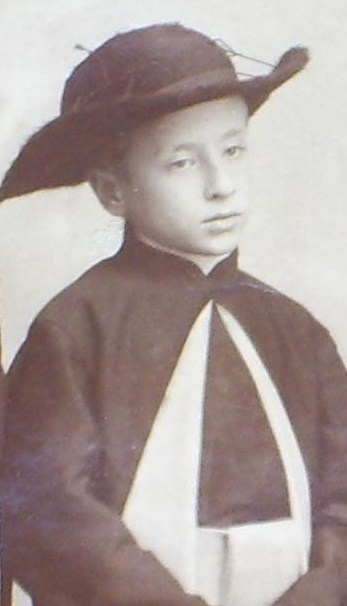
Tritschler at age 10, wearing the uniform of the Collegio Pio-Latino-Americano Pontificio.

Tritschler's mother died when he was three, and his father was elderly, so he sent a young Guillermo to be educated by his maternal uncle Prisciliano Córdova, a prominent cleric of the Diocese of Puebla de los Ángeles. In 1888, he and his brother Alfonso were sent to Rome to study at the Collegio Pio-Latino-Americano Pontificio. His brother Martín was at the time an advanced student at the Pontifical Gregorian University.

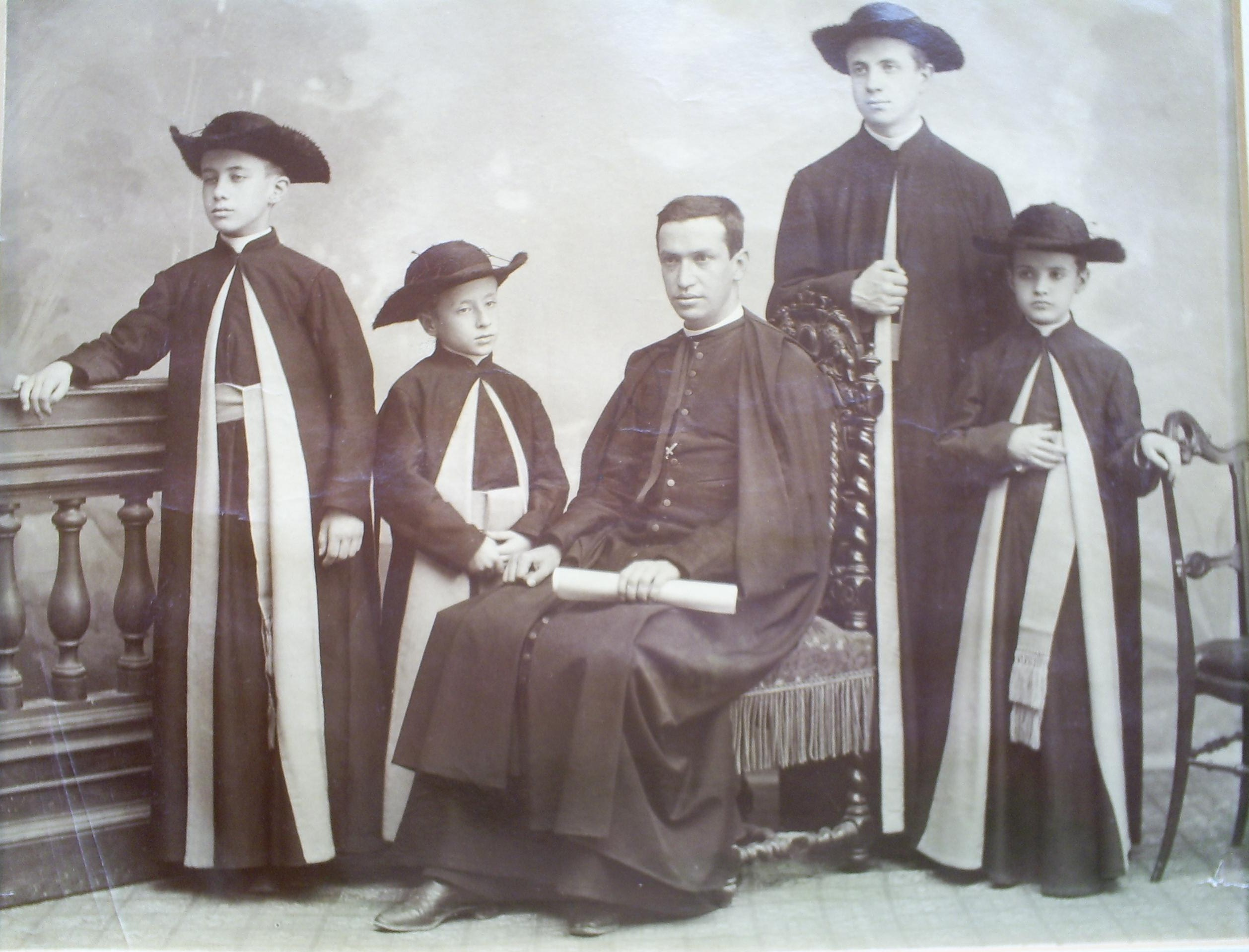
Vicar of the Diocese of Puebla (and later Archbishop of Puebla) Ramón Ibarra y Gonzalez (seated), the Tritschler y Córdovas standing from left to right: Alfonso, Guillermo, and Martín, and Luis de la Maza, 11 May 1888.

After finishing at the Latin American College, he moved on to study at the Pontifical Gregorian University, where among Tritschler's teachers were the philosopher Vincenzo Remer, the future cardinal Louis Billot, and the rector of the Pontifical Gregorian University Felipe Sottovia. Because he was sent to the college at the unusually young age of 10, a December 1932 catalog of past students records him as the pupil longest lived studying in Rome, at 14 years, two months, and 27 days. He returned to Mexico on 4 August 1902, with three doctorates, one each in Philosophy, Theology, and Canon Law.

=== Priesthood ===
Before returning to Mexico, Tritschler was invited by Manuel Fulcheri y Pietrasanta, on the recommendation of Louis Billot, to serve in the Archdiocese of Mexico. However, fears of conscience delayed his ordination. His fears were relieved when Bishop José Ramón Ibarra y González, the Bishop of Puebla de los Ángeles, granted his request that he be ordained by his brother Bishop Martín Tritschler y Córdova, Bishop of Yucatán. On 8 May 1903, on the Feast of the Apparition of St. Michael, he received from his brother the tonsure and minor orders. On 5 June 1904, in the Church of San Francisco El Grande, he received the subdiaconate from Bishop Francisco Orozco y Jiménez, Bishop of Chiapas. On 13 June 1904 in the Church of San Antonio de Padua, his brother Martín ordained him a deacon, and he was ordained to the priesthood on the morning of 19 June 1904 in the chapel of the Archbishop's palace of Puebla. He celebrated his first Mass two days later on 21 June 1904, the Feast of St. Aloysius Gonzaga, in the Church of Nuestra Señora de Ocotlán, near the city of Tlaxcala.

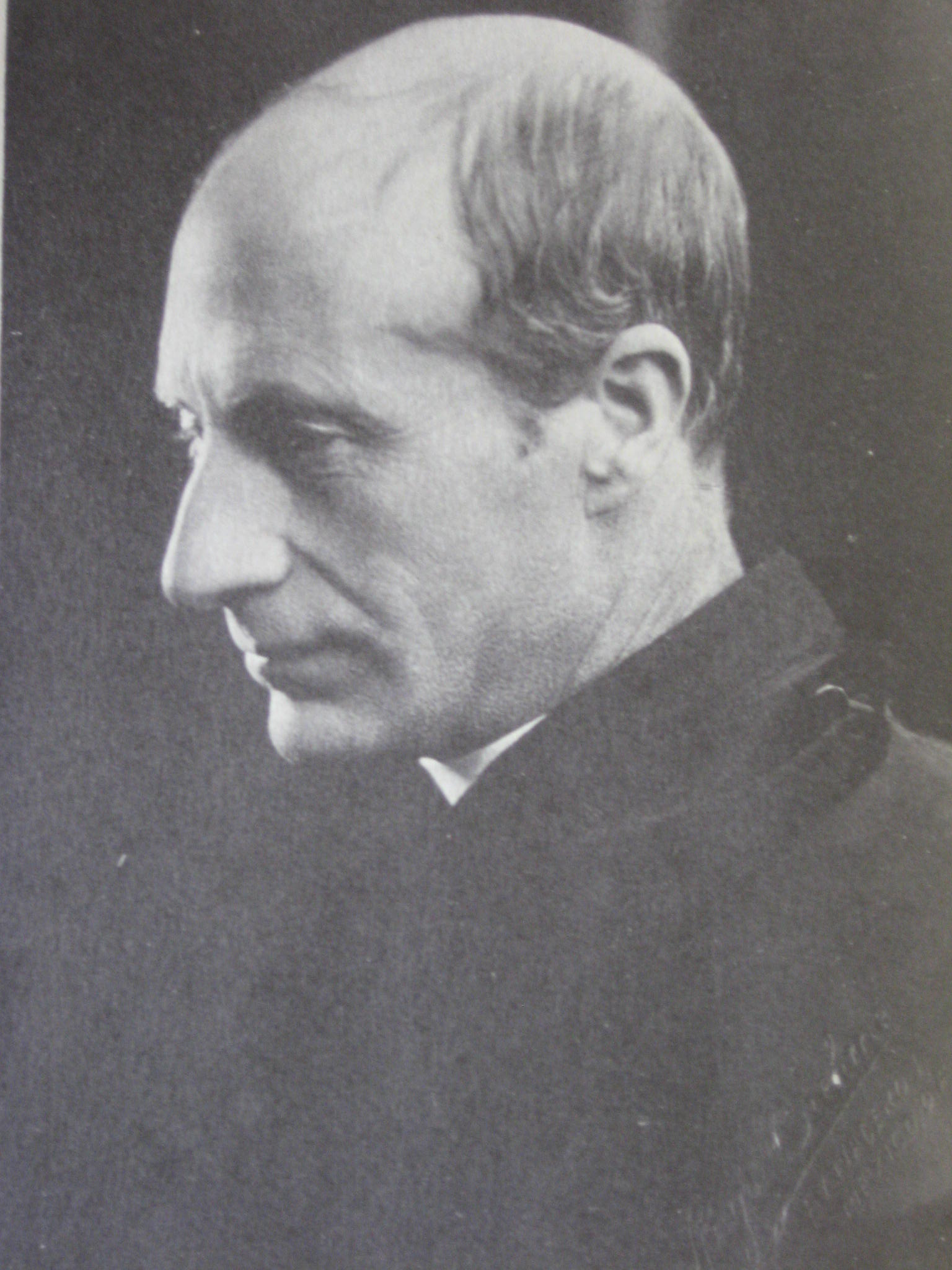
Tritschler as canon penitentiary of the Mexico City Metropolitan Cathedral, 1929.

==== Professorship at the Seminary of Mexico ====
Tritschler went to work at the Seminario Conciliar de Mexico, which was still under construction at the time. The architect, Manuel Gorozpe, aware of Tritschler's esteem, asked his advice of the project, and was influenced to change some of the plans of the seminary. Tritschler was the Chair of the Philosophy Department starting in 1911, and at the end of that year was also assigned to teach courses in Dogmatic Theology. He taught at the seminary for nearly 20 years, interrupted only by two trips to Rome he made over that period. In 1916 he received the official appointment of "spiritual father," a position that entailed encouraging seminarians to pursue their vocation and complete their studies until ordination to the priesthood.

In 1929, Archbishop Pascual Díaz y Barreto, Archbishop of Mexico, appointed Tritschler to the position of Canon Penitentiary of the Metropolitan Cathedral in Mexico City, officially starting this position on 1 August 1929.

=== Episcopacy ===
==== Bishop of San Luis Potosí ====
Styles of Guillermo Tritschler y Córdova
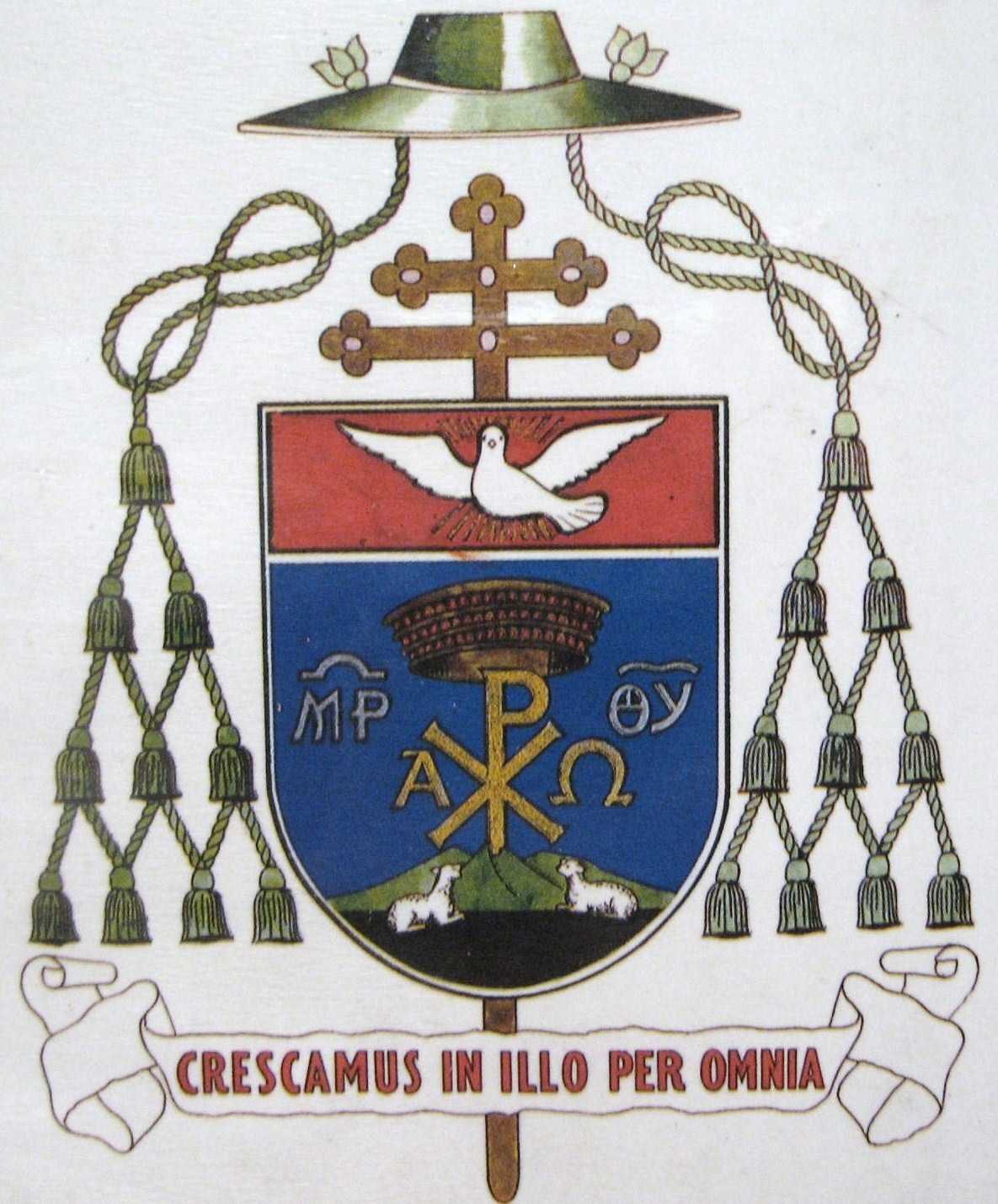
- Reference style: His Excellency; The Most Reverend
- Spoken style: Your Excellency
- Religious style: Archbishop

After the death of Archbishop Miguel de la Mora y Mora in 1930, Archbishop of San Luis Potosí, the Apostolic Delegate Archbishop Leopoldo Ruiz y Flóres called Tritschler to the Apostolic Delegation to notify him that Pope Pius XI had recommended him to be the new Archbishop of San Luis Potosí. Tritschler did not wish to have the position, and presented five reasons to the Holy See against his own credit, saying:

"I wrote to Rome, opposing and explaining that in conscience I could not accept the post of bishop and gave five reasons, adding that if necessary I could confirm with an oath: I do not know how to preach; could one meet the duty of a bishop who does not preach? I do not know how to write, and a bishop should write pastoral letters. I have never exercised authority over any person, I have never had any minor trials of authority, not even on a waiter at the seminary. I do not know how to scold. One more, I do not know how to handle money."

The Holy See ignored Tritschler's excuses, and L'Osservatore Romano published his appointment as the sixth Archbishop of San Luis Potosí on 30 January 1931. His brother Martín Tritschler y Córdova, who ordained him to the priesthood and whose position had since been risen to Archbishop of Yucatán, was principal consecrator at his episcopal consecration, which took place on 22 April 1931 in the Basilica of Our Lady of Guadalupe, north of Mexico City. Bishop Manuel Fulcheri y Pietrasanta, Bishop of Zamora, and Bishop Luis María Altamirano y Bulnes, Bishop of Huajuapan de León, were co-consecrators.

As Archbishop of San Luis Potosí, Tritschler reestablished religious practices that had been suspended by the Mexican government, increased the number of seminarians and revamped their training and education, strengthened Catholic organizations, and brought in instructors from Mexico and foreign nations to educate the clergy. He also continued work on the Cathedral of the Immaculate Conception in Matehuala, the construction of which had been interrupted by the Mexican Revolution. Shortly before the end of his tenure he directed his efforts towards the completion of the Church of Our Lord of Saucito (Spanish: Iglesia de Nuestra Señor de Saucito).

==== Archbishop of Monterrey ====
In 1940, Archbishop José Guadalupe Ortíz y López, Archbishop of Monterrey, and Pope Pius XII appointed Tritschler his successor on 22 February 1941. He was installed in this position on 20 June 1941. He told members of the Diocese of San Luis Potosí disappointed by his departure:

"If it had been possible to ask the Holy Father to continue in this diocese, I would have done that, because I wanted to because I had been consecrated to this, and I had married her, and with her I will always remain, but it is better to accept to submit to the will of God manifested by the Pope."

On 25 June 1941 he officially began his work as archbishop of the Archdiocese of Monterrey, which he strengthened with more priests and new churches. He increased the number of seminarians in the archdiocese, reformed and strengthened their curriculum, and provided new facilities to house the seminary. He always had a deep involvement with the seminary, visiting it on the first Friday of every month to celebrate Mass dedicated to the Sacred Heart of Jesus, and often coming by to hold discussions and lectures with the seminarians. The following year, on 15 November 1942, his brother Martín, Archbishop of Yucatán, died and Tritschler attended his funeral.

During his tenure as Archbishop of Monterrey, Tritschler was principal co-consecrator of three bishops and one archbishop: Archbishop Fortino Gómez León in 1943, Bishop José Gabriel Anaya y Diez de Bonilla in 1947, Bishop Celestino Fernández y Fernández in 1948, and Bishop Arturo Vélez Martínez in 1951.

In Tritschler's later years, his mental alertness declined, possibly due to an aging-associated disease. He died on 29 July 1952, at the age of 74. He was originally buried in the Shrine of Our Lady of the Oak in Monterrey, and today his remains have been placed in the Metropolitan Cathedral of Our Lady of Monterrey, the seat of the Archdiocese of Monterrey.

== Legacy ==
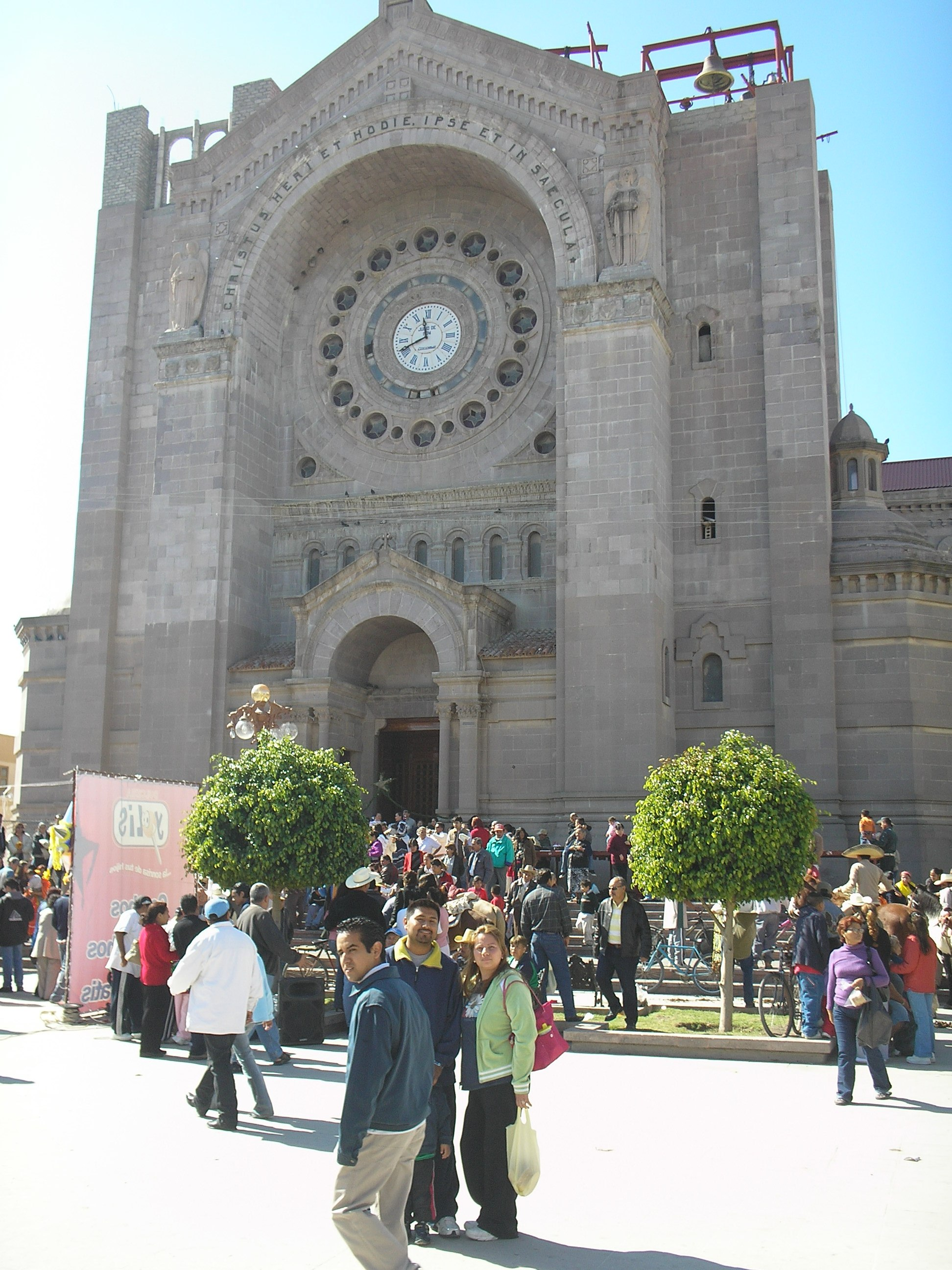
The Matehuala Cathedral, completed by Tritschler in the 1930s.

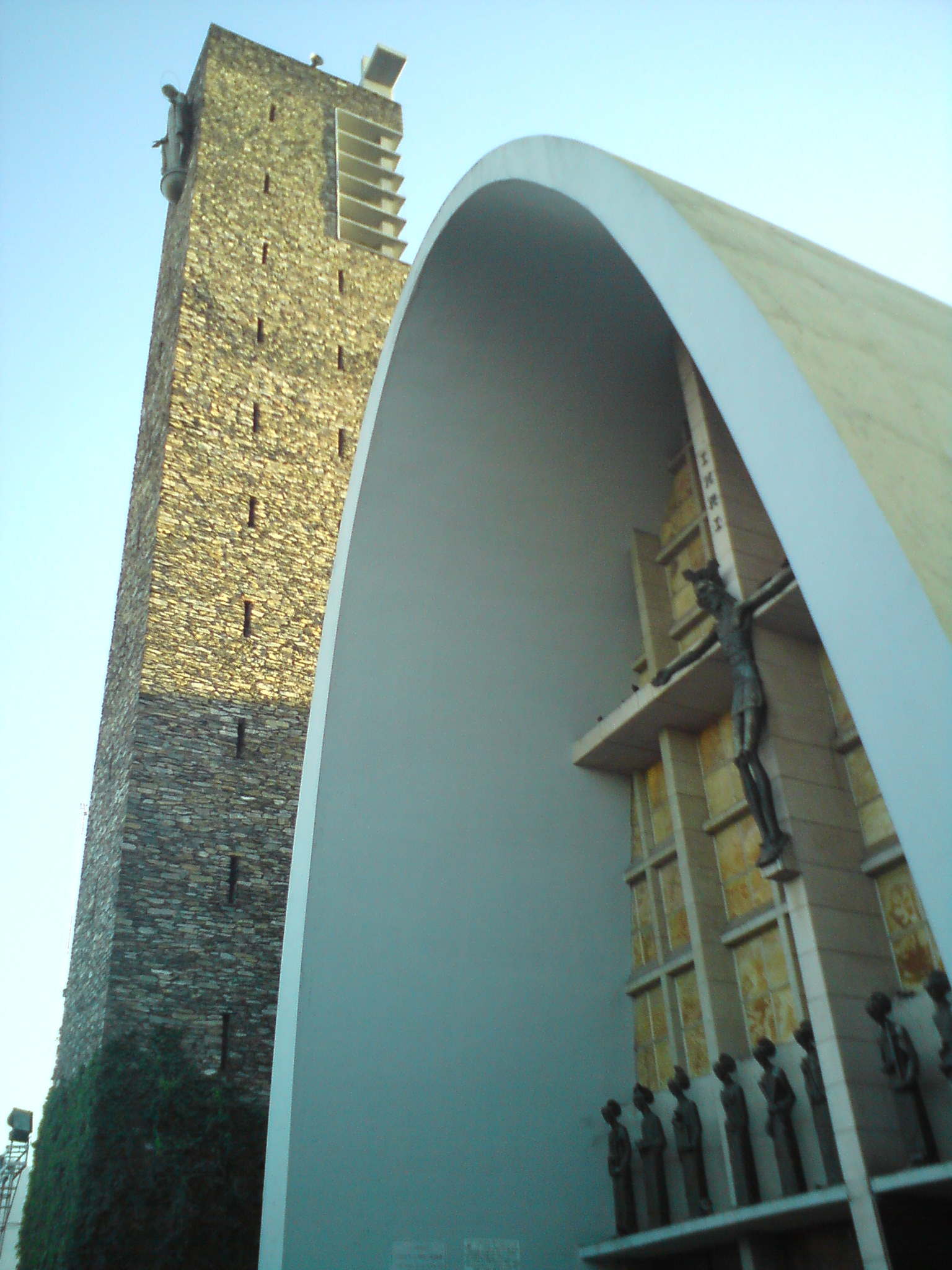
Basilica of the Purísima Concepción, Archdiocese of Monterrey, completed 1943.

Tritschler's perhaps best-recognized legacy is that of the ecclesiastical architecture he left behind in the dioceses he led. Among these buildings are the Basilica of the Purísima Concepción, the Matehuala Cathedral, and the Iglesia de Nuestra Señor de Saucito.

His burial site at the Monterrey Cathedral is often visited by religious pilgrims, and he has amassed a significant following among Mexican Catholic devotees.

== Canonization ==
The Archdiocese of Monterrey has introduced Tritschler as a cause for canonization, and the Congregation for the Causes of Saints has granted him the title Servant of God.

== Episcopal lineage ==
- Cardinal Scipione Rebiba
- Cardinal Giulio Antonio Santorio (1566)
- Cardinal Girolamo Bernerio, OP (1586)
- Archbishop Galeazzo Sanvitale (1604)
- Cardinal Ludovico Ludovisi (1621)
- Cardinal Luigi Caetani (1622)
- Cardinal Ulderico Carpegna (1630)
- Cardinal Paluzzo Paluzzi Altieri degli Albertoni (1666)
- Pope Benedict XIII (1675)
- Pope Benedict XIV (1724)
- Archbishop Enrico Enríquez (1743)
- Bishop Manuel Quintano Bonifaz (1749)
- Cardinal Buenaventura Córdoba Espinosa de la Cerda (1761)
- Cardinal Giuseppe Doria Pamphili (1773)
- Pope Pius VIII (1800)
- Pope Pius IX (1827)
- Bishop José Montes de Oca y Obregón (1871)
- Archbishop Próspero Alarcón y Sánchez de la Barquera (1892)
- Archbishop Martín Tritschler y Córdova (1900)
- Archbishop Guillermo Tritschler y Córdova (1931)
