= Martin Tritschler =

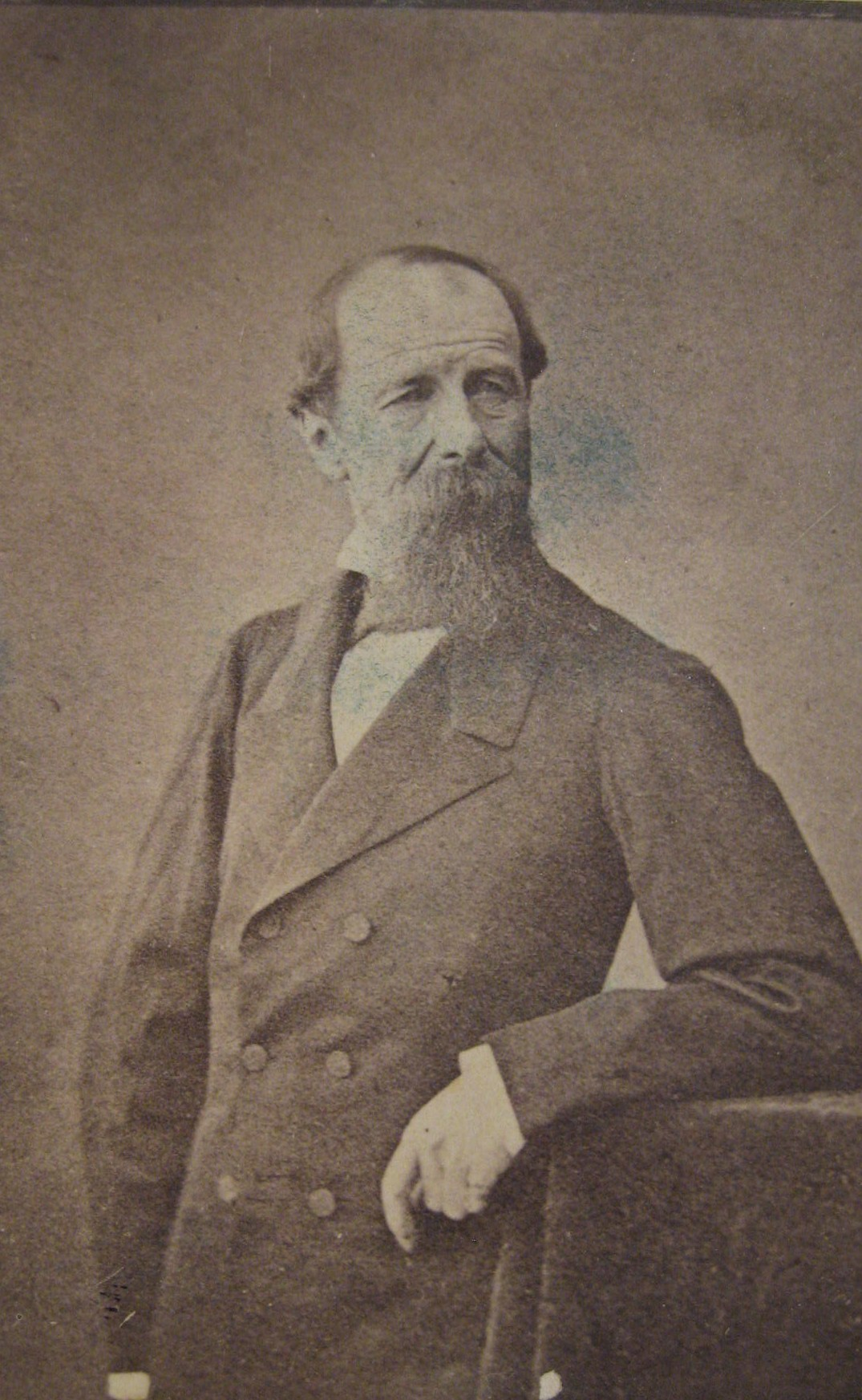
- Born: October 22, 1814 present day Schwärzenbach, Baden-Württemberg, Germany
- Died: 6 January 1894 (aged 79); Chalchicomula de Sesma, Puebla, Mexico
- Occupation: clockmaker
- Spouse: Rosa María Cordova y Puig
- Children: Martin, Joaquín, Rosa María, María Dolores, María Luisa, Alfonso, Guillermo, Guillermo Tranquilino
- Parent(s): Martin Tritschler and Fides Schwörer

Martin Tritschler (October 22, 1814 – January 6, 1894) was a manufacturer and retailer of clocks who arrived in Mexico in 1833 from Germany, and was thus part of the first generation of non-Spanish immigrants after independence. He also participated prominently in the war against the United States, gave aid to the victims of the explosion of the Colecturía de San Andrés, during the Second French Intervention, and in 1873 he became the first man to fly the flag of Mexico on the summit of Pico de Orizaba. He was the father of Mexican archbishops Martín Tritschler y Córdova and Guillermo Tritschler y Córdova.

== Early life ==
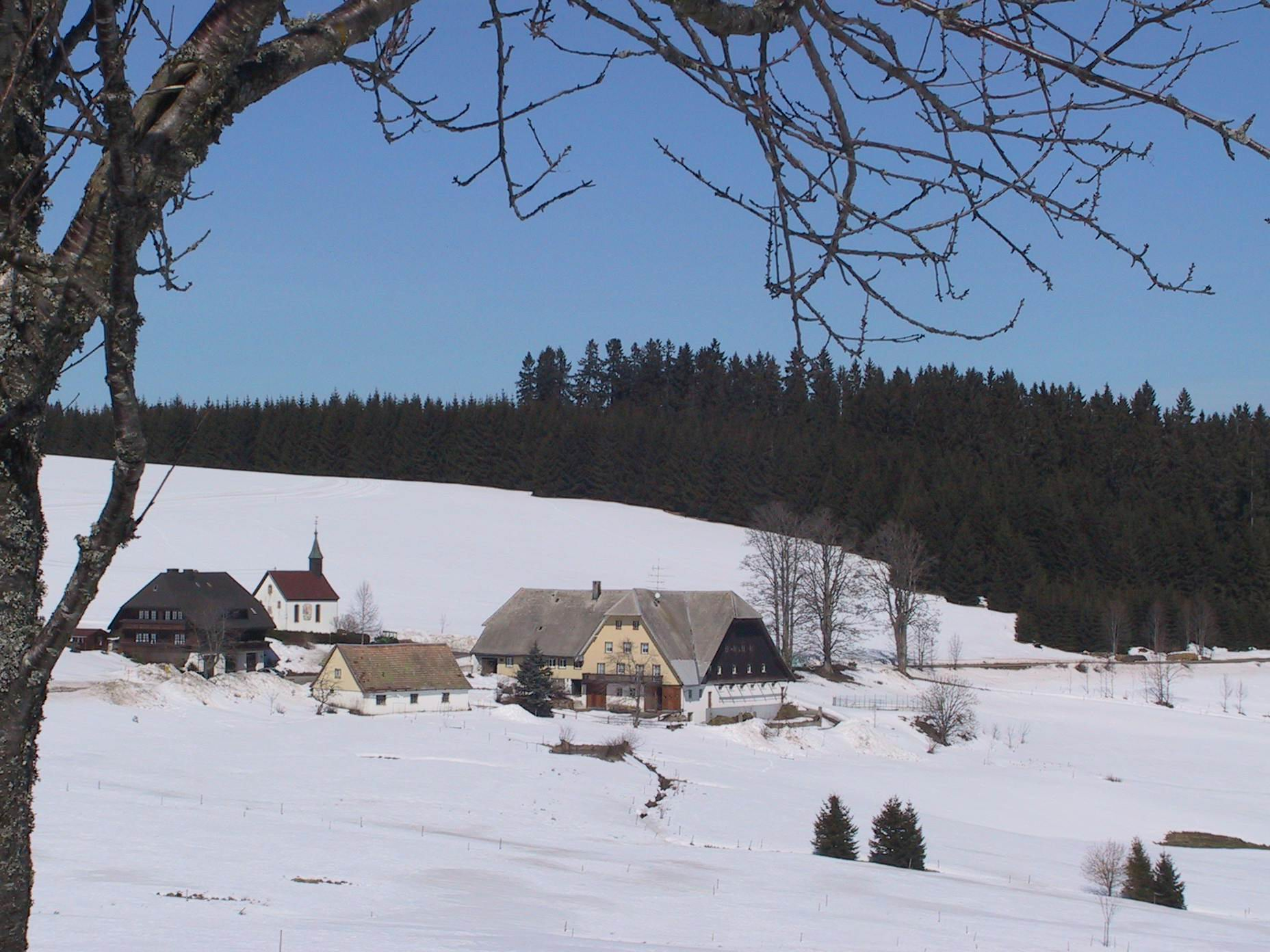
The Ebenemooshof farmhouse, birthplace of Tritschler

Tritschler was born in a farmhouse within the Black Forest, now part of Baden-Württemberg, Germany. As a consequence of primogeniture, he left the farm and moved to Mexico.

== Life in Mexico ==
Tritschler opened his clockmaking workshop in Puebla and it soon prospered. The type of clocks he specialized in were cuckoo clocks. The demand was such that he need a full team of employees, providing work to several Mexican workers. The success of his business and the hospitality he encountered, encouraged him to definitively settle in the country and ask for Mexican citizenship, which he attained on April 18, 1844.

=== Involvement in the Mexican–American War ===
Tritschler enlisted in the ranks of the National Guard within the Brigade Arteaga which was the contribution from Puebla to resist the US military, which by that time had taken the port of Veracruz and were marching towards Mexico City. Martin was appointed Captain of said brigade and participated in the Battle of Cerro Gordo, being hurt to some degree. After the loss of the garrison, the Mexican army retreated to the capital leaving Puebla at the mercy of the invaders.

Once the city was occupied, Tritschler was tasked with convincing German soldiers in the American military to defect. The increasing number of Germans leaving the ranks of Winfield Scott was attributed largely to Tritschler; these defectors would later join the Irish and others in the Saint Patrick's Battalion. He was arrested and found guilty by Scott's "council of war" on two charges of spying and fomenting desertion. He was sentenced to death but as a result of Tritschler's popularity in Puebla, Scott released him on a fabricated claim of legal insanity.

=== Marriage and children ===
Martin Tritschler married Rosa María Córdova y Puig at the Hacienda de Santa Ana in Chalchicomula on June 5, 1867. A marriage that produced eight children.
