= Penitentiary Point =

Coordinates: 38.275°N 110.669°W

Penitentiary Point is a cliff in Wayne County, Utah, in the United States.

Penitentiary Point was probably so named because the striped rocks resemble jail stripes.
