= Canon penitentiary =

Cathedral priest who hears confessions

A canon penitentiary (Latin: canonicus penitentiarius) is a member of the chapter of a cathedral or collegiate church who serves as the principal confessor of the diocese. He possesses ordinary jurisdiction in the internal forum, a power attached to the office itself and not delegable to others. The canon penitentiary may absolve both residents and visitors within the diocese, as well as subjects of the diocese who are outside its boundaries. His power extends also to sins and censures reserved to the bishop. The office of general confessor is foreshadowed in the early history of penitential discipline. Distinct legislation concerning the office is found in the Fourth Lateran Council (1215), but especially in the Council of Trent (1545–1563).
