= Lucas Martínez =

Lucas Martínez may refer to:

- Lucas Martínez (field hockey) (born 1993), Argentine hockey player
- Lucas Martínez (footballer, born 1997), Chilean footballer
- Lucas Martínez (footballer, born 1998), Uruguayan footballer
- Lucas Martínez Quarta (born 1996), Argentine footballer
- Lucas Martínez Lara, (1946–2016), Mexican Roman Catholic bishop
