= Boari =

Boari is an Italian surname. Notable people with the surname include:

- Adamo Boari (1863–1928), Italian civil engineer and architect
- Lucilla Boari (born 1997), Italian archer
