= Diocese of Matehuala =

Roman Catholic diocese in Mexico

Coordinates: 23.646404°N 100.644379°W

Diocese of Matehuala Dioecesis Matehualensis Diócesis de Matehuala
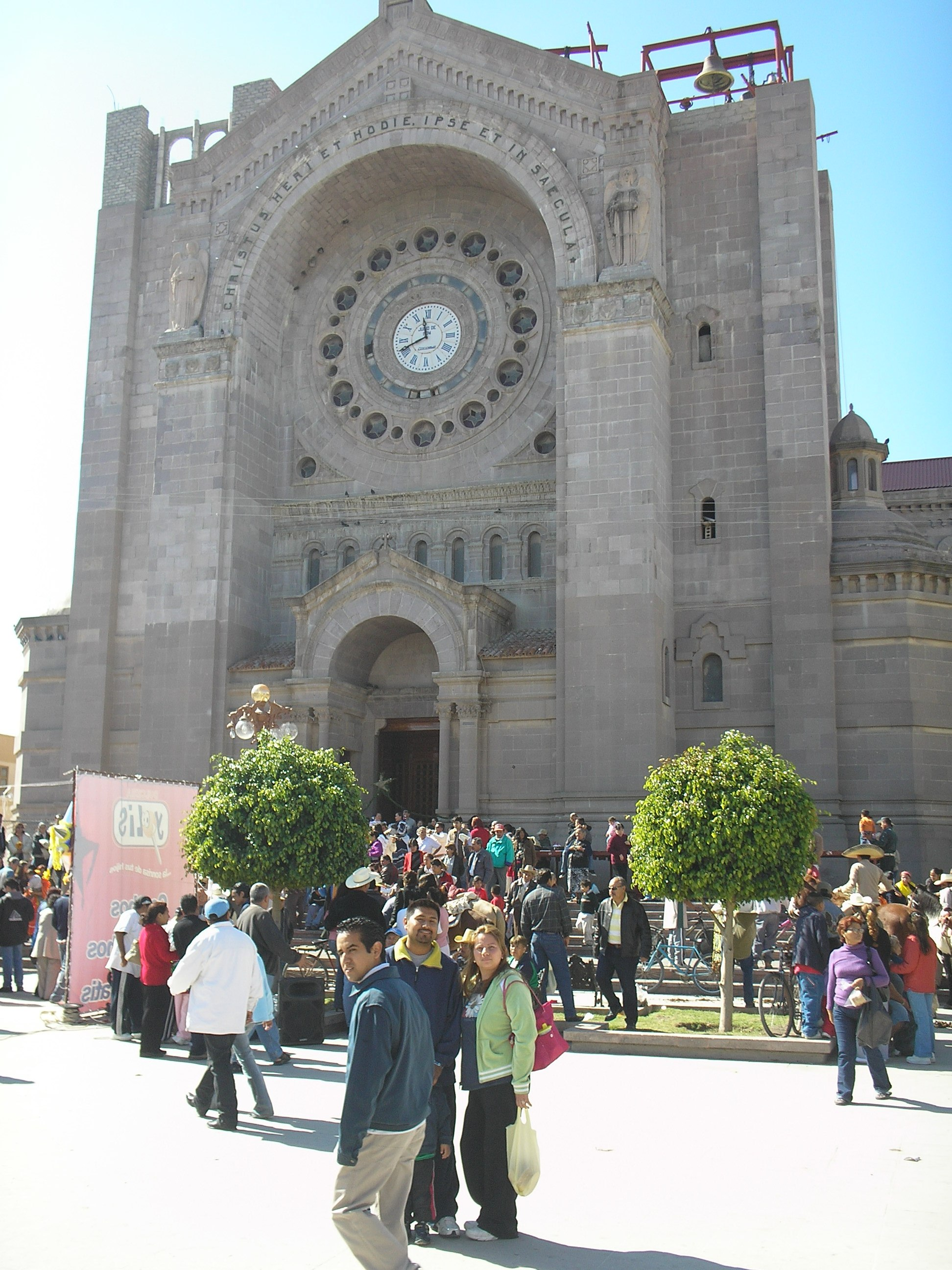
- Catedral de la Inmaculada Concepción

Location
- Country: Mexico
- Ecclesiastical province: Province of San Luis Potosí
- Metropolitan: Matehuala

Statistics
- Area: 26,912 km^{2} (10,391 sq mi)
- Population: Total; Catholics: (as of 2023); 273,234; 239,332 (87.6%)
- Parishes: 17

Information
- Denomination: Catholic Church
- Sui iuris church: Latin Church
- Rite: Roman Rite
- Established: 28 May 1997; 29 years ago
- Cathedral: Cathedral of the Immaculate Conception
- Secular priests: 34 (31 diocesan, 3 religious orders)

Current leadership
- Pope: Leo XIV
- Bishop: Sede vacante
- Metropolitan Archbishop: Jorge Alberto Cavazos Arizpe
- Apostolic Administrator: Jorge Alberto Cavazos Arizpe

Map
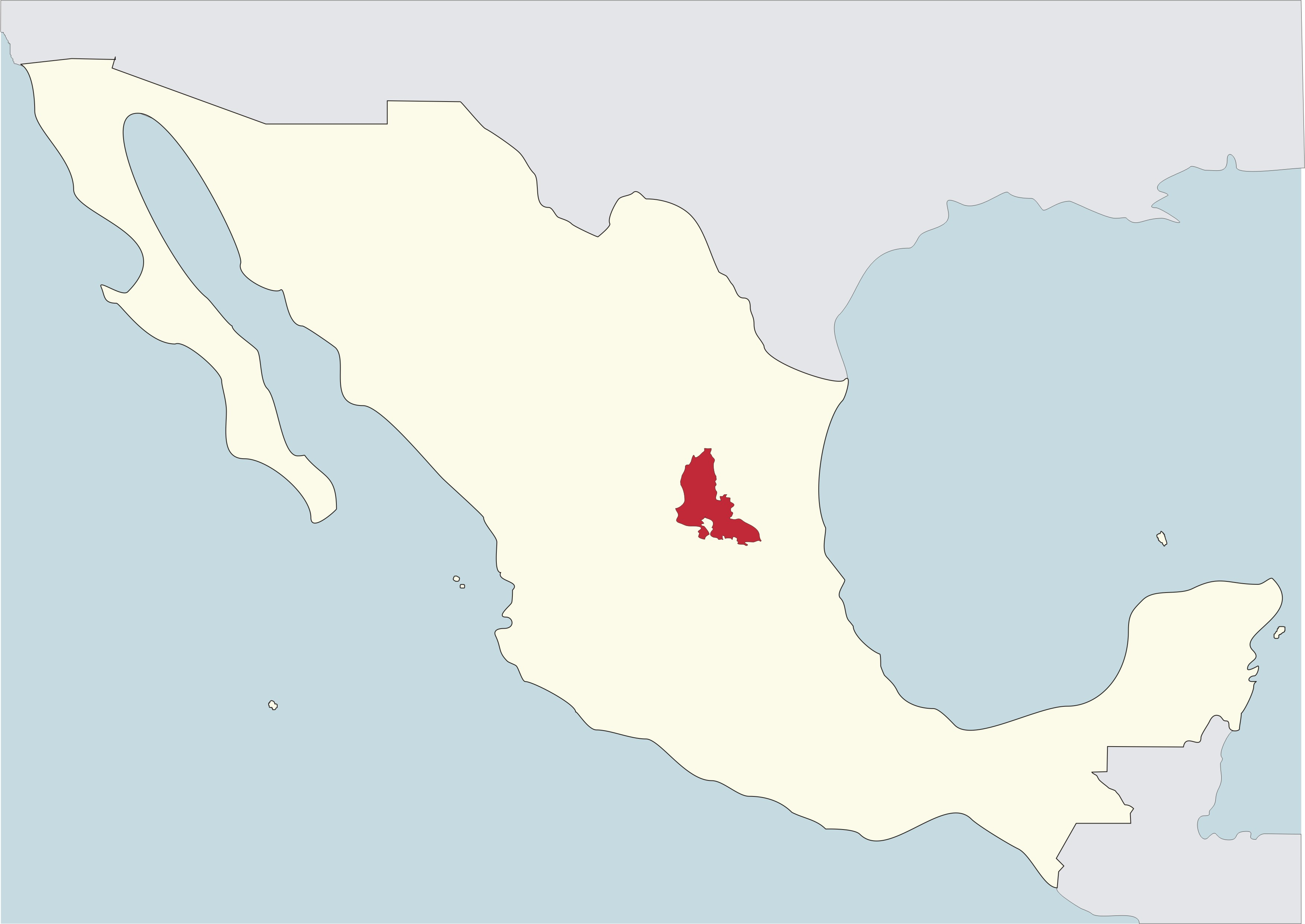

The Roman Catholic Diocese of Matehuala (Latin: Dioecesis Matehualensis) (erected 28 May 1997) is a suffragan diocese of the Archdiocese of San Luis Potosí.

== Ordinaries ==
- Rodrigo Aguilar Martínez (1997–2006), appointed Bishop of Tehuacán, Puebla
- Lucas Martínez Lara (2006–2016)
- Margarito Salazar Cárdenas (2018–2026), appointed Bishop of Tampico, Tamaulipas
  - Apostolic Administrator Jorge Alberto Cavazos Arizpe (2026–Present); Archbishop of San Luis Potosí

== Episcopal See ==
- Matehuala, San Luis Potosí

== See also ==
- Immaculate Conception Cathedral, Matehuala

== External links and references ==
- "Diocese of Matehuala". Catholic-Hierarchy.
