= Octavio Medellín =

American sculptor

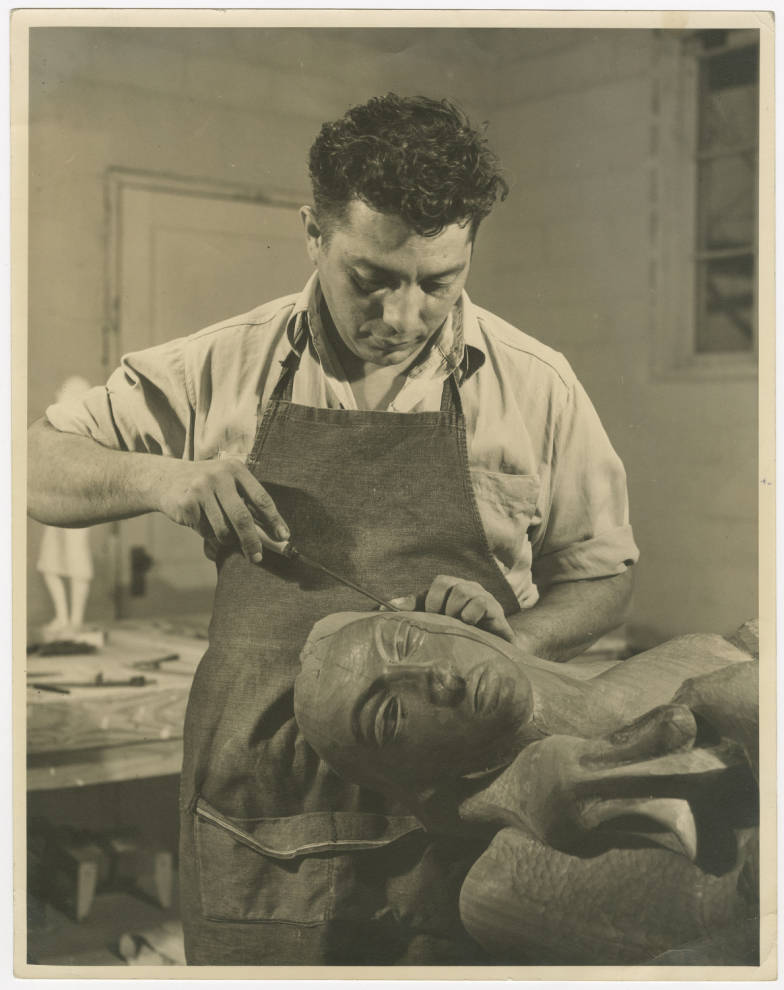
- Born: 1907; Matehuala, San Luis Potosi, Mexico
- Died: 1999 (aged 91–92)

Octavio Medellín (1907–1999) was a Mexican-American sculptor and teacher, best known for the Mexican-influenced sculptures that he created in Texas in the first half of his career. In the 1950s, 1960s, and 1970s, his art became more abstract.

Medellín wrote that “sincere art must be elemental and close to the earth,” and he strove to create art influenced by “the common people and everyday life,” not “politics” or “sophisticated ideas.” In the 1930s and 1940s, Medellín's work consisted primarily of sculptures and some paintings, many of which are owned by Southern Methodist University's Bywaters Special Collections.

== Early life ==
Born of the son of an Otomi Indian mine worker in San Luis Potosi, Mexico in 1907, Medellín's native country was turning violent and riots were erupting more frequently than before. The violent chaos of the revolution in his country caused his family to relocate several times before they would eventually settle in to San Antonio, Texas in 1920. Before moving to San Antonio, Medellín had demonstrated an intriguing passion for the arts when he was able to attend school at the age of 11. Medellín's father had been reported to have been imprisoned during their time in Mexico but was released as the fighting began to dwindle. Due to this, it remains a mystery as to why Medellín's father had returned to Mexico, where he would tragically die by the same forces of the revolution that caused him to move his family to San Antonio.

After hearing the news of his father's death, Medellín would take on several odd jobs in order to provide for his family. Shortly after, Medellín would attend the San Antonio Art Institute to pursue a career in art with other well-known Mexican artists such as José Arpa and Xavier Gonzales. He later moved in 1928 to continue his art studies at the Chicago Art Institute. A year into his college education in 1929, he returned to his native country to start a two-year study of Mexico's art, style, customs, and history. Medellín traveled "throughout the Gulf Coast, including the Yucatan" and explored the various talent and art created by the rural areas and the many "ancient ruins and sculpture of the Mayan and Toltec Indians." On his voyage, he met and became lifetime friends with the painter Carlos Mérida. During this period, Medellín was deeply inspired of the Mexican art (both ancient and modern) that helped him define his heritage and that enabled him to create his own artworks.

== Career ==
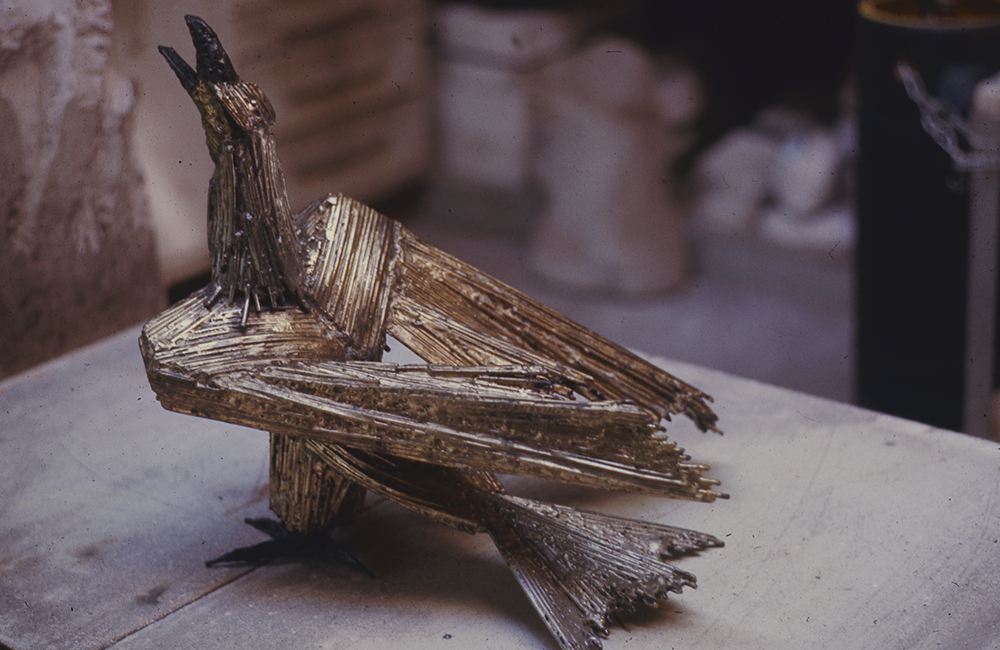
Bald Eagle, copper and bronze tubing, 1976

Medellín returned to San Antonio in 1931 to teach at the Witte Museum. He later helped to open La Villita Art Gallery in cooperation with some other local artists. It was around this time that he met a young artist and heiress named Lucy Maverick. Her family was influential in San Antonio politics in the late 19th and 20th centuries, and was very active in historic preservation. Maverick supported and encouraged him. She even funded his journey (with his wife and child) to Mexico to studt the ruins at Chichén Itzá and other pre-Hispanic sites

After moving to Dallas, he became one of the Dallas Nine, a group of influential artists active in Dallas between 1930 and 1940 who created artworks drawing influences from the Southwest.

After teaching at the Witte Museum in San Antonio, he was an instructor at several Dallas area institution, including North Texas State Teachers College (now the University of North Texas), Southern Methodist University, and the Dallas Museum of Fine Arts School. It was during this time that Medellín experimented with other forms of art such as ceramics, mosaics, glass works, and lost-wax bronze casting. As he learned these new techniques, he would also teach them to students in his class. In 1966 he opened his own school, the Medellin School of Sculpture in Dallas, now the Creative Arts Center of Dallas, where he would continue to teach until 1979. After retirement, he moved to a small town in Texas named Bandera with his wife, Consuelo.

Many institutions and museums have exhibited his sculptures, including the Museum of Modern Art in New York, the Dallas Museum of Arts, and the Witte Museum in San Antonio. In 1989, Medellín and his family donated much of his art and archives to the Southern Methodist University, where they are housed at the Bywaters Special Collections. After donating his works to multiple institutions, he died in 1999.

"I went to Mexico to see art. Actually, the art was the people. To see the people. To learn about the people. Because I have a spirit of their universe. People to me are all the same. It makes no difference what color they are...Sculpture, I do it the same way. I don't care to do a particular race or anything, but I do a figure..." – Octavio Medellin

== Medellín's notable art and sculptures ==
- "Xtol: Dance of the Ancient Mayan People"
- "The Promised Land"
- "Mazatl Tecutli, Lord of the Deer"
- "Landing Eagle"
- "Garden of the Glorious Mysteries"
- "Menorah"
- "Conceived"
- "Mother and Child"
- "The Son"

== See also ==
- Mexican Revolution
- Mexican-Americans
- Mexican Art
- Otomi

== Bibliography ==
Castro Mark A. and Dallas Museum of Art. 2022. Octavio Medellín : Spirit and Form. Dallas Texas: Dallas Museum of Art.

Cordova, Ruben C, 2023. "Octavio Medellín: Spirit and Form at the Dallas Museum of Art, Part 1," Glasstire, January 10. https://glasstire.com/2023/01/10/octavio-medellin-spirit-and-form-at-the-dallas-museum-of-art-part-1/

Lewthwaite, Stephanie. 2012. “Modernism in the Borderlands: The Life and Art of Octavio Medellín,” Pacific Historical Review: Vol. 81, No. 3 (August 2012), pp. 337-370.
