= Palacio de Bellas Artes =

Cultural centre in Mexico City

Palace of Fine Arts
- Palacio de Bellas Artes
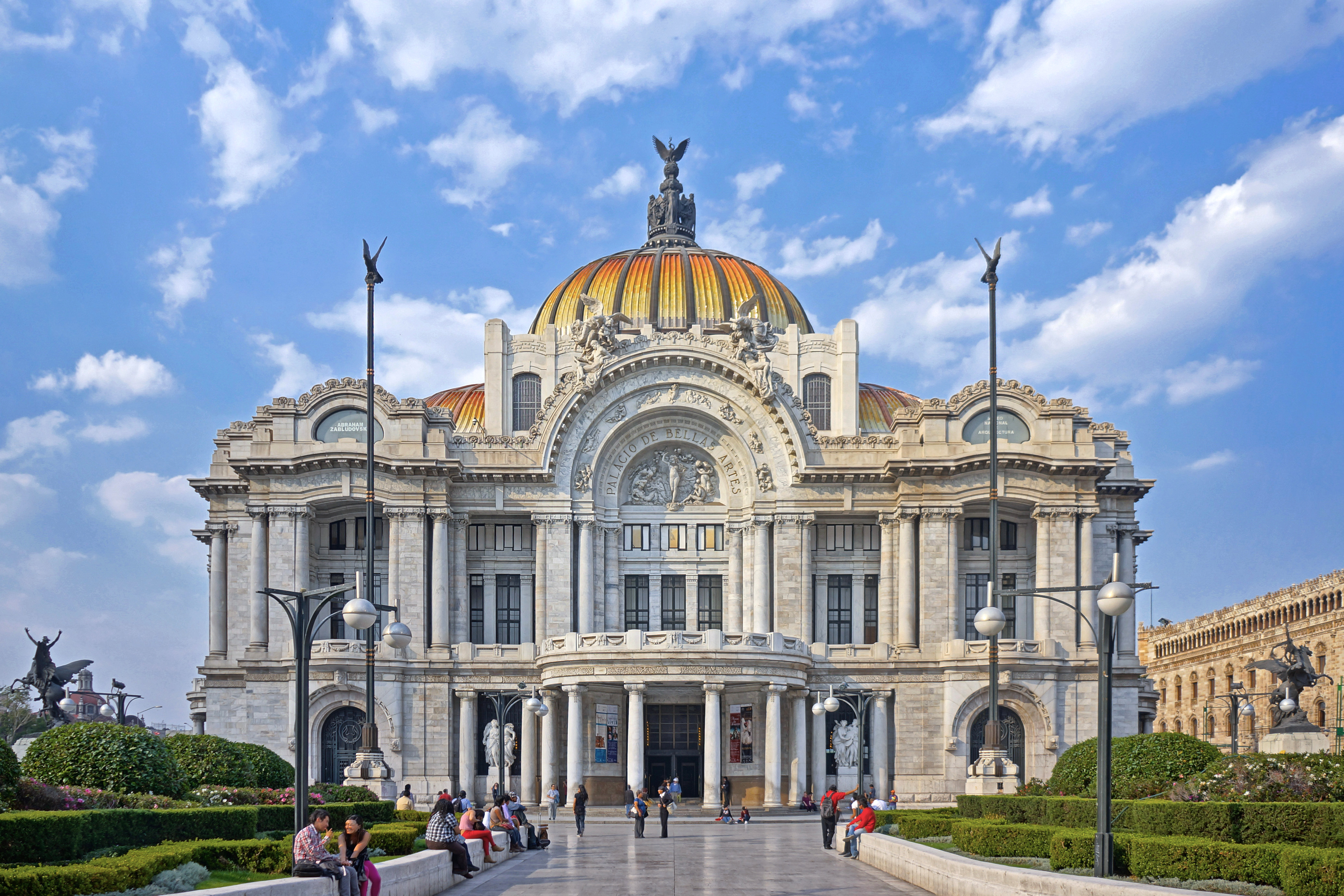
- Front view of the Palacio de Bellas Artes

General information
- Architectural style: Art Nouveau / Neoclassical (exterior); Art Deco (interior)
- Location: Centro, Cuauhtémoc, Mexico City, Mexico
- Coordinates: 19°26′07″N 99°08′29″W
- Construction started: 1 October 1904
- Inaugurated: 1934

Design and construction
- Architects: Adamo Boari, Federico Mariscal, Géza Maróti, Agustí Querol Subirats, Edgar Brandt among others

Other information
- Seating capacity: 1,590

The Palacio de Bellas Artes ("Palace of Fine Arts") is a prominent cultural center in Mexico City. It hosts performing arts events, literature events and plastic arts galleries and exhibitions (including important permanent Mexican murals). "Bellas Artes" for short, has been called the "art cathedral of Mexico", and is located on the western side of the historic center of Mexico City which is close to the Alameda Central park.

Bellas Artes replaced the original National Theater, built in the late 19th century. The latter was demolished as part of urban redesign in Mexico City, and a more opulent building was planned to celebrate the centennial of the Mexican War of Independence in 1910. The initial design and construction was undertaken by Italian architect Adamo Boari in 1904, but complications arising from the soft subsoil and the political problem both before and during the Mexican Revolution, hindered then stopped construction completely by 1913. Construction resumed in 1932 under Mexican architect Federico Mariscal and was completed in 1934. It was then inaugurated on 29 November 1934.

The exterior of the building is primarily Art Nouveau and Neoclassical and the interior is primarily Art Deco. The building is best known for its murals by González Camarena, Diego Rivera, Siqueiros and others, as well as the many exhibitions and theatrical performances it hosts, including the Ballet Folklórico de México.

== History ==
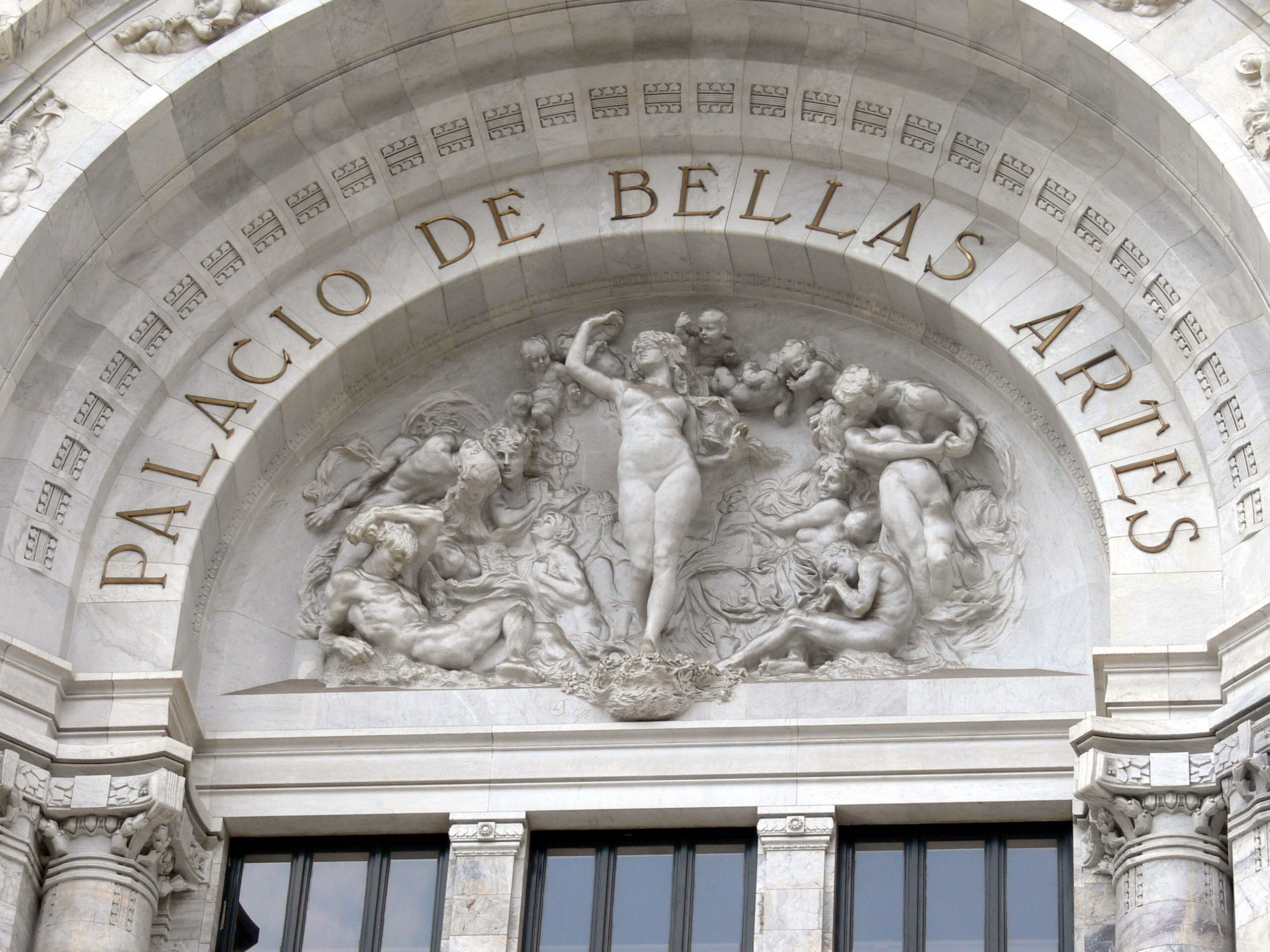
La armonía (Harmony), 1910, Leonardo Bistolfi

The oldest known structure on the site was the Convent of Santa Isabel, whose church was built in 1680. However, significant Mexica finds, such as a sacrificial altar in the shape of a plumed snake have been found here. The convent area suffered frequent drought during the early canal period and development here grew quickly.

In spite of this, the convent remained until it was forcibly closed in the 1860s by the Reform Laws. It was replaced by a textile mill and lower-class housing.

A section of this housing, on Santa Isabel Alley, was torn down and replaced by the National Theater in the latter 19th century. During the late 19th century and very early 20th, this theatre was the site of most of Mexico City's high culture, presenting events such as theatre, operettas, Viennese dance and more.

It was then decided to replace this building with a more opulent one for the upcoming Centennial of Mexican Independence celebrations in 1910. The old theatre was demolished in 1901, and the new theatre would be called the Gran Teatro de Ópera. The work was awarded to Italian architect Adamo Boari, who favored neoclassical and art nouveau styles and who is responsible for the Palacio del Correo which is across the street. Adamo Boari promised in October 1904 to build a grand metallic structure, which at that time only existed in the United States, but not to this size. The first stone of the building was placed by Porfirio Díaz in 1904. Despite the 1910 deadline, by 1913, the building was hardly begun with only a basic shell. One reason for this is that the project became more complicated than anticipated as the heavy building sank into the soft spongy subsoil. The other reason was the political and economic instability that would lead to the Mexican Revolution. Full hostilities suspended construction of the palace completely and Adamo Boari returned to Italy.

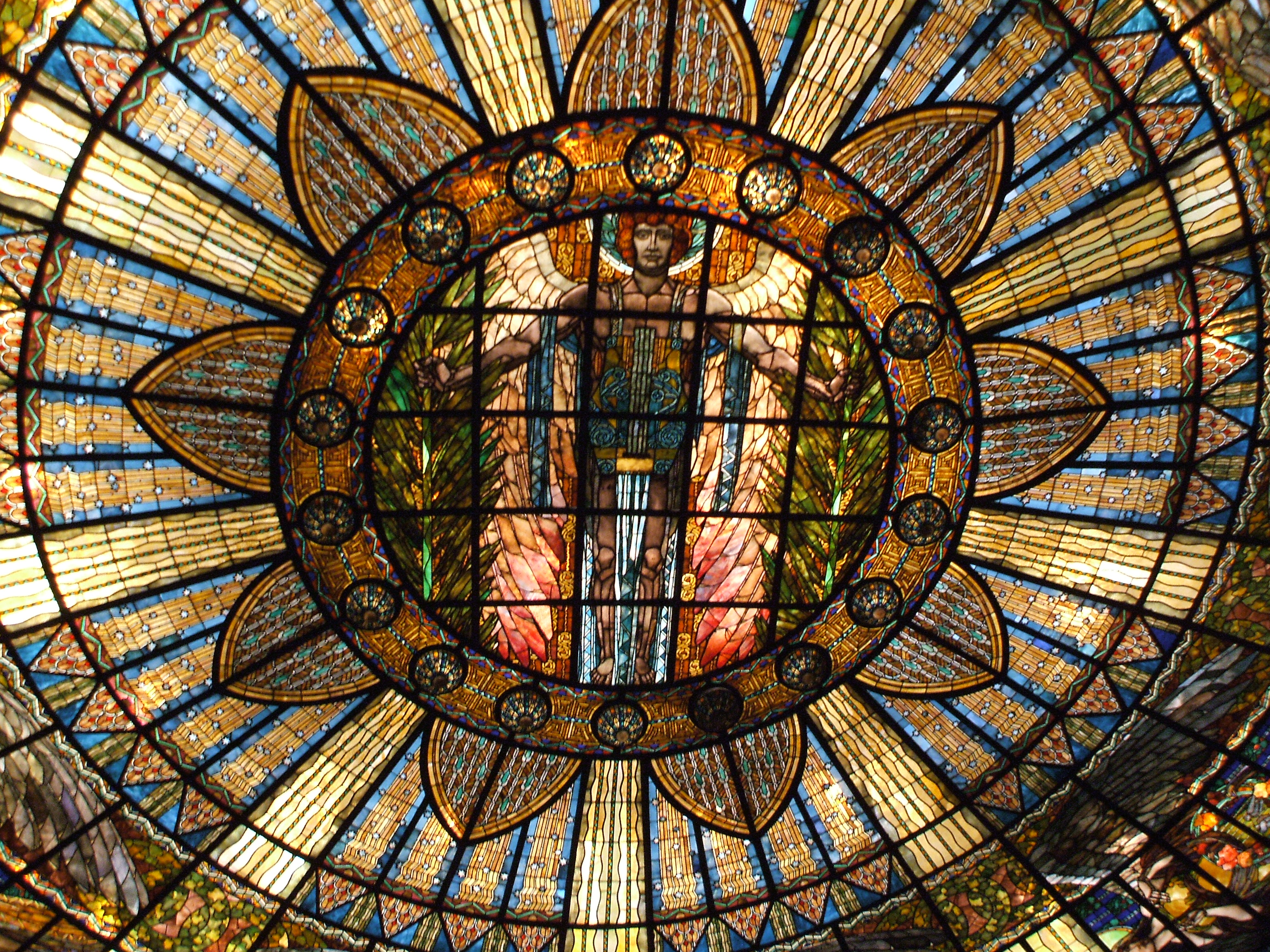
Inner canopy

The project would sit unfinished for about twenty years. In 1932, construction resumed under Mexican architect Federico Mariscal. Mariscal completed the interior but updated it from Boari's plans to the more modern Art Deco style. The building was completely finished in 1934, and was inaugurated on 29 November of that year. The inaugural work presented in the theatre was "La Verdad Sospechosa" by Juan Ruiz de Alarcón in 1934. In 1946, the Instituto Nacional de Bellas Artes (National Institute of the Fine Arts) was created as a government agency to promote the arts and was initially housed at the Museo Nacional de Artes Plásticas, the Museo del Libro and other places. It is now at the Palacio.

In this theatre, Maria Callas debuted in the opera Norma in 1950.

Since its initial construction, very little has been updated or modified. However, intensive renovation efforts were begun in 2009 for the upcoming 2010 celebrations. Much of the equipment and machinery is original from the early 20th century. Much of the technological equipment is being updated, especially in the theatre which needs computerized lights, sound systems and other improvements. Other work will improve the acoustics. Upgrades to the theatre will allow for multimedia shows which were not available before. The main hall has had no renovation or upgrade work since it opened in 1934. Renovations here will lessen the number of people the hall can accommodate but should make the area more comfortable.

== The building ==
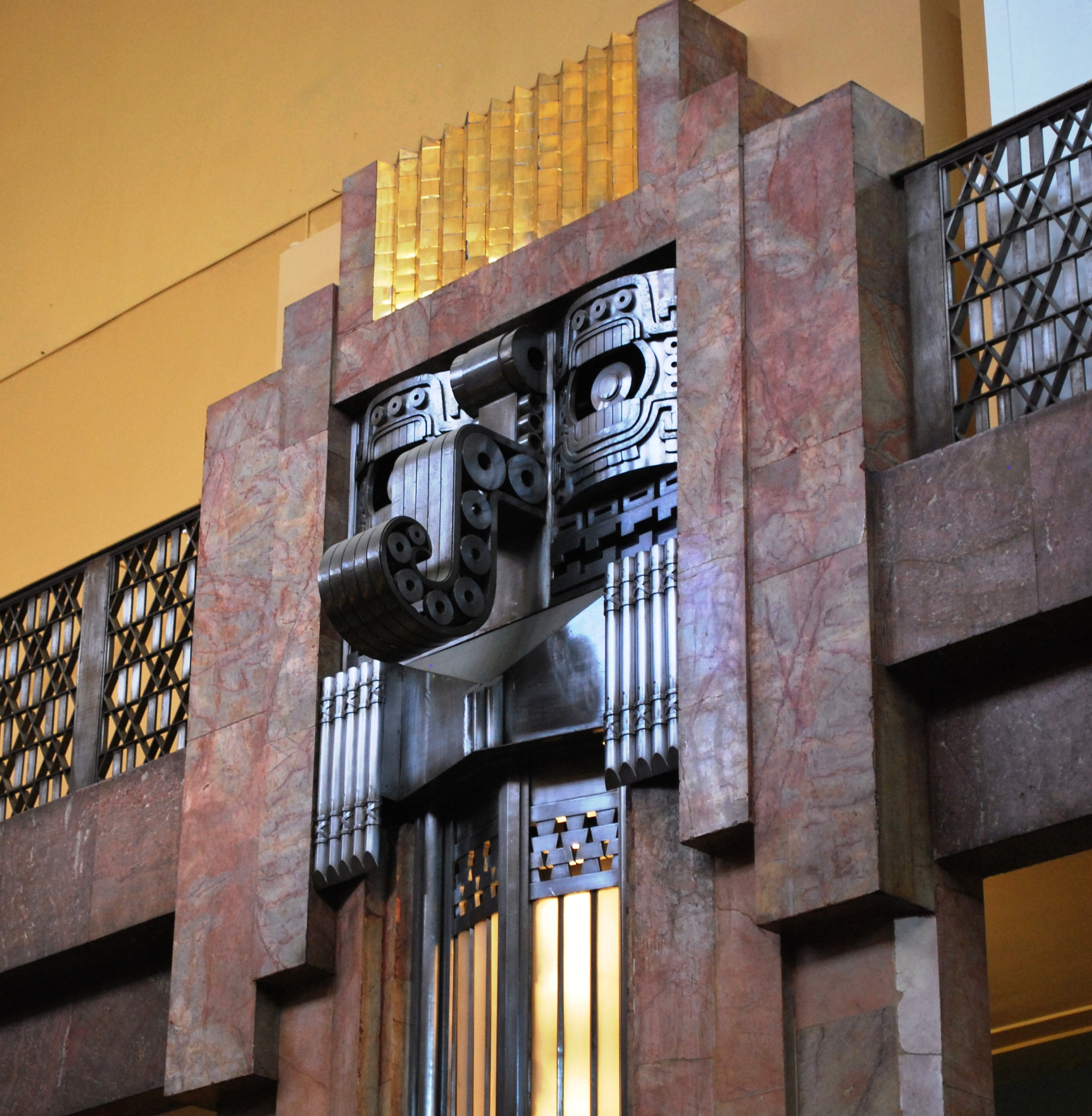
Art Deco depiction of Chaac on a light panel

The palace has a mixture of a number of architectural styles; however, it is principally Art Nouveau and Art Deco. Art Nouveau dominates the exterior, which was done by Adamo Boari, and the inside is dominated by Art Deco, which was completed by Federico Mariscal. Since construction began in 1904, the theater (which opened in 1934) has sunk some four meters into the soft soil of Mexico City.

The main facade faces Avenida Juárez. The building uses beige marble from Yautepec, Morelos for the lower structure, while white marbles from Buenavista de Cuéllar, Guerrero and Carrara, Italy were used for the facades. In the interior of the portal are sculptures by Italian Leonardo Bistolfi. It consists of "Harmony", surrounded by "Pain", "Rage", "Happiness", "Peace" and "Love". Another portion of the facade contains cherubs and sculptures representing music and inspiration. On the plaza front of the building, designed by Boari, there are four Pegasus sculptures which were made by Spaniard Agustí Querol Subirats. These had been in the Zocalo before being brought here. The roof covering the center of the building is made of crystal designed by Hungarian Géza Maróti and depicts the muses with Apollo. One aspect of the Palace which has since disappeared is the "Pergola", which was located in the Alameda. It was constructed to house pictorial exhibitions for the 1910 celebrations, but it was demolished in 1973.

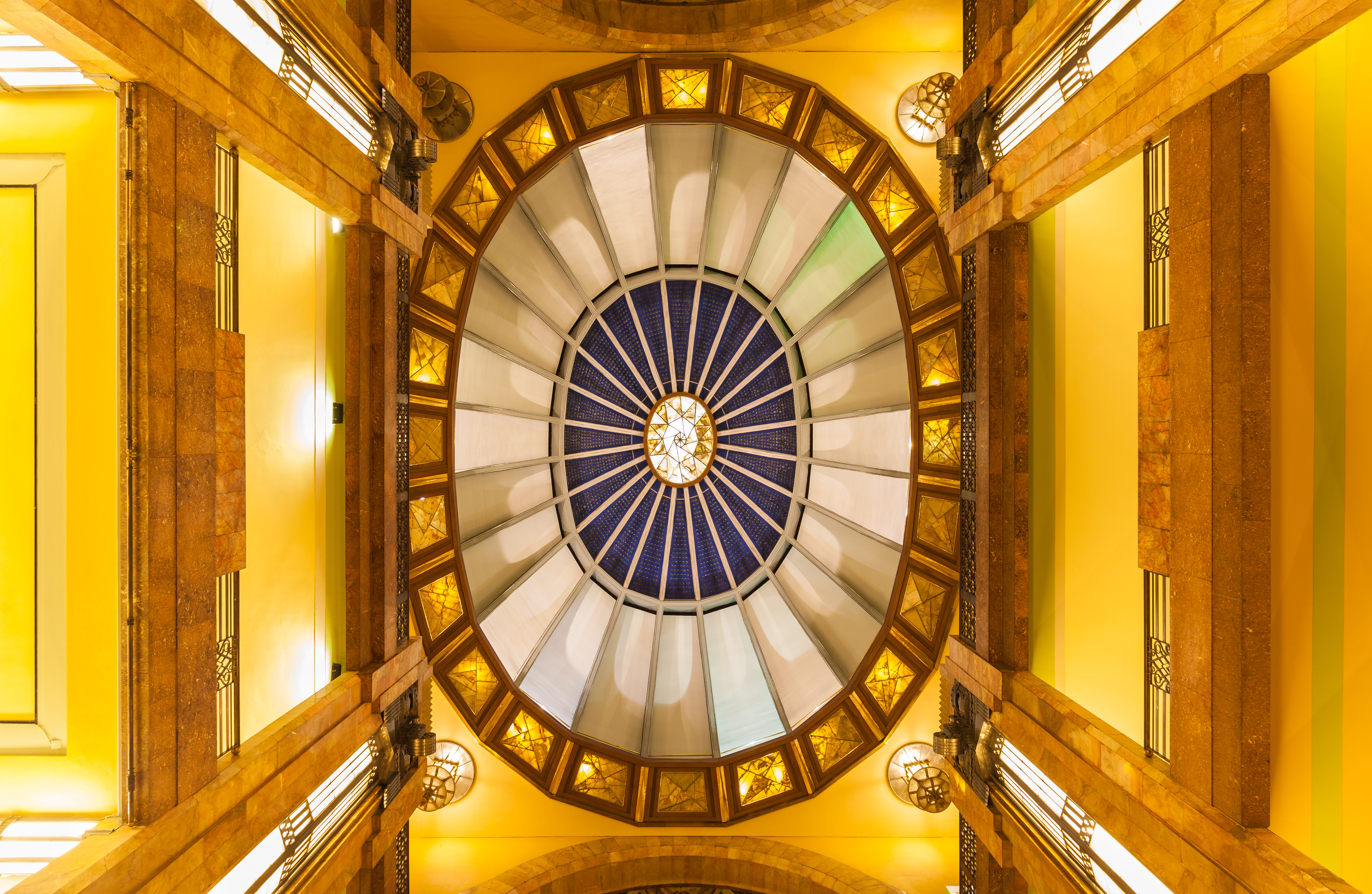
Interior view of the dome, Géza Maróti

The interior is divided into three sections: the main hall with adjoining smaller exhibition halls, the theatre and the offices of the Insituto Nacional de Bellas Artes. The main hall is covered by the Marotti glass and iron roof. It and the balconies of all three upper floors can be seen from the ground floor below. In areas of the main hall, pre-Hispanic motifs done in Art Deco style, such as serpents’ heads on window arches and Maya Chaac masks on the vertical light panels distinguish this interior from its contemporaries. The smaller exhibition halls are located on the first and second floors. The first floor is decorated with crystal lamps, created by Edgar Brandt and hold murals by Rufino Tamayo. The Adamo Boari and Manuel M. Ponce halls hold music and literature events. And the National and International halls are for exhibitions. The second floor has smaller exhibition halls as well as murals by José Clemente Orozco, David Alfaro Siqueiros, Diego Rivera, Jorge González Camarena, Roberto Montenegro and Manuel Rodríguez Lozano. The third floor is occupied by the Museum of Architecture. The ironwork was designed in Italy by Alessandro Mazzucotelli and in Mexico by Luis Romero Soto.

At the entrance of the theatre, there are mascarons in bronze with depictions of Tlaloc, and Chaac, the Aztec and Maya deities of water, which along with the rest were designed by Gianette Fiorenzo. On the arch over the stage there are representations of various mythological personas such as the Muses with Apollo. This was constructed in Hungary in the workshops of Géza Maróti. However, the most impacting aspect is the stage "curtain" which is a stained glass foldable panel created out of nearly a million pieces of iridescent colored glass by Tiffany's in New York. This stage curtain is the only one of its type in any opera house in the world and weighs 24 tons. The design of the curtain has the volcanos Popocatépetl and Iztaccíhuatl in the center. Around them is a Mexican landscape surrounded by images of sculptures from Yautepec and Oaxaca. This design was inspired by work done by artist Gerardo Murillo (Dr. Atl). The theatre has a capacity of 1,590.

== Events ==
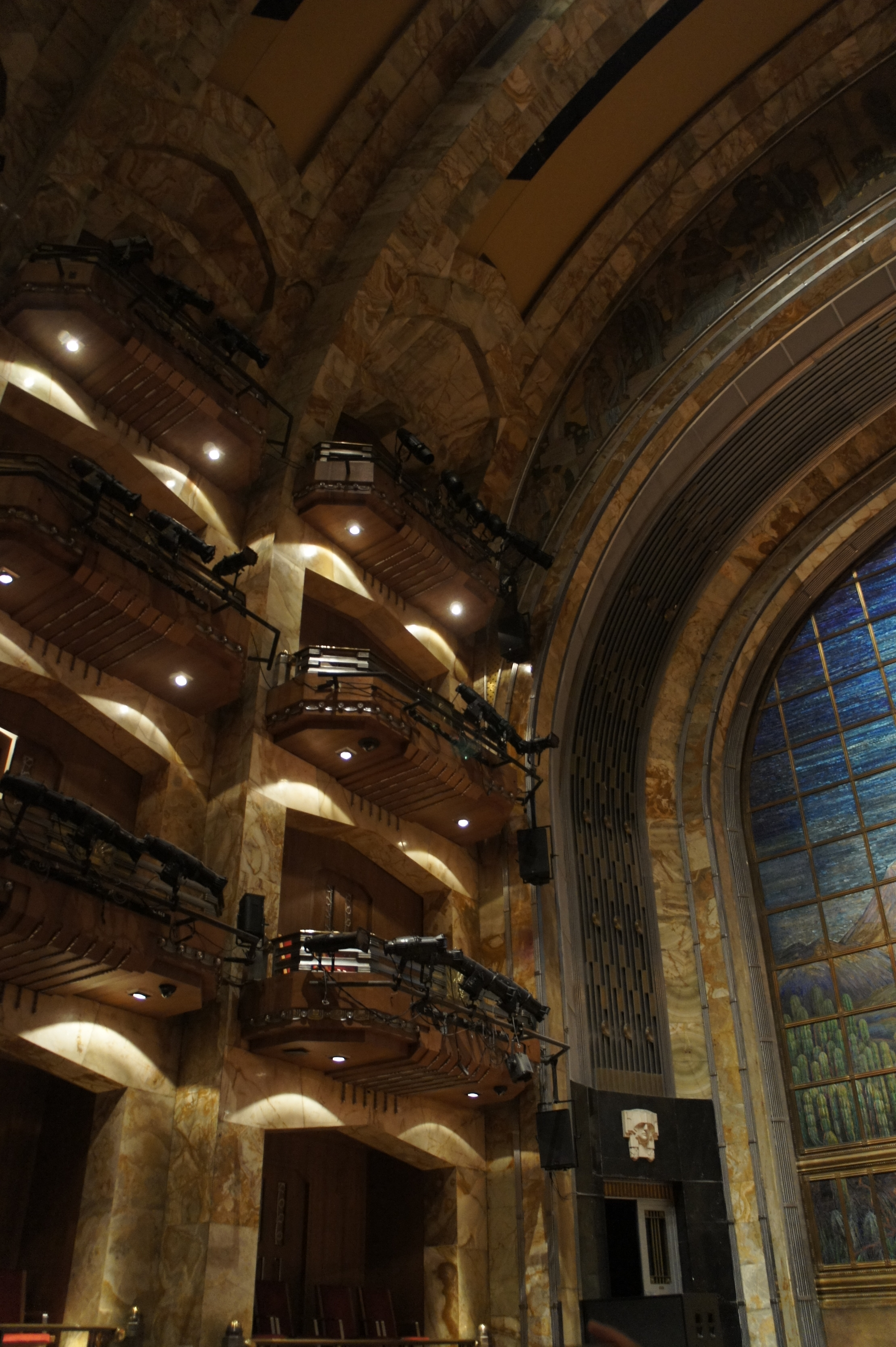
Interior of the main concert hall

Exterio view of the main entrance

The Palace has been the scene of some of the most notable events in music, dance, theatre, opera and literature and has hosted important exhibitions of painting, sculpture and photography. It has hosted some of the biggest names from both Mexico and abroad. It has hosted poetry events as well as those related to popular culture. Artists and companies are from all parts of Mexico and abroad. It has been called the "Cathedral of Art in Mexico". It was declared an artistic monument in 1987 by UNESCO. The building is administered by the Instituto Nacional de Bellas Artes of the federal government. The palace receive on average 10,000 visitors each week.

Two of the best-known groups which regularly perform here are the Ballet Folklórico de México Compania Nacional de Opera de Bellas Artes and the National Symphonic Orchestra. The first performs in the theatre twice a week and is a spectacle of pre and post Hispanic dance of Mexico. A typical program includes Aztec ritual dances, agricultural dances from Jalisco, a fiesta in Veracruz, a wedding celebration — all accompanies by mariachis, marimba players and singers. Regular annual events include the Premio Quorum for Mexican designers in graphic and industrial materials and the Premios Ariel for Mexican films.

Numerous individual events have been held here. These include several exhibitions of Frida Kahlo's work, and a number of appearances by Luciano Pavarotti. In 1987, Bellas Artes hosted a legendary performance of Jesusa Rodríguez's Donna Giovanni, an adaptation of Mozart's opera with a female cast. Other appearances have been made by Mexican baritone Jorge Lagunes (2002) and Catalan guitarist Joan Manuel Serrat (2003). Events that have been held here include "ABCDF Palabras de Ciudad" (2002) showing life in popular housing in photographs and video, "Bordados del Mexico Antiguo" (Embroidery of Old Mexico) showing processes, history and design, Rem Koolhaas Premio Pritzker 2000" conference and "Exchanging Views: Visions of Latin America" which was an exhibit from the collection of Patricia Phelps de Cisneros comprising 148 works by 72 artists from across Latin America in 2006.

Occasionally, the plaza in front of the Palace is the scene of protests such as those against the Iraq War in 2003 and against bullfighting in 2010.

=== Memorial services ===
The Palacio de Bellas Artes has also been a place for honoring and mourning important figures from the world of arts and culture. These people were recognized with a special tribute because of their work and contributions to their fields. In total, 65 people have received this kind of farewell at the Palace. The first was the muralist José Clemente Orozco in 1949. Here are some of the individuals who were honored with their body present at the site:

- José Clemente Orozco; 1949
- Virginia Fábregas; 1950
- Frida Kahlo; 1954
- Diego Rivera; 1957
- María Tereza Montoya; 1970
- Agustín Lara; 1970
- David Alfaro Siqueiros; 1974
- Rosario Castellanos; 1974
- Jorge González Camarena; 1980
- Juan Rulfo; 1986
- Rufino Tamayo; 1991
- Mario Moreno Cantinflas; 1993
- Lola Beltrán; 1996
- Gabriel Figueroa; 1997
- Octavio Paz; 1998
- Amalia Hernández; 2000
- María Félix; 2002
- Consuelo Velázquez; 2005
- Raúl Anguiano; 2006
- Miguel Aceves Mejía; 2006
- Salvador Elizondo; 2006
- Andrés Henestrosa; 2008
- Carlos Monsiváis; 2010
- Roberto Cantoral; 2010
- Alí Chumacero; 2010
- Leonora Carrington; 2011
- Pedro Armendáriz, Jr; 2011
- Carlos Fuentes; 2012
- Chavela Vargas; 2012
- Ernesto de la Peña; 2012
- Joaquín Cordero; 2013
- Carmen Montejo; 2013
- José Emilio Pacheco; 2014
- Gabriel García Márquez; 2014
- Vicente Leñero; 2014
- Juan Gabriel; 2016
- José Luis Cuevas; 2017
- Fernando del Paso; 2018
- Rafael Coronel; 2019
- Miguel León Portilla; 2019
- José José; 2019
- Gilberto Aceves Navarro; 2019
- Mario Lavista; 2021
- Héctor Bonilla; 2022
- Federico Silva; 2022
- Ignacio López Tarso; 2023
- Silvia Pinal; 2024

== Murals ==
The floors between the ground floor and the uppermost floor are dominated by a number of murals painted by most of the famous names of Mexican muralism.

On the 2nd floor are two early-1950s works by Rufino Tamayo: México de Hoy (Mexico Today) and Nacimiento de la Nacionalidad (Birth of Nationality), a symbolic depiction of the creation of the mestizo (person of mixed indigenous and Spanish ancestry) identity.

At the west end of the 3rd floor is Diego Rivera's El hombre controlador del universo (Man, controller of the universe- known as Man at the Crossroads), originally commissioned for New York's Rockefeller Center in 1933. The mural depicts a variety of technological and societal themes (such as the discoveries made possible by microscopes and telescopes) and was controversial for its inclusion of Lenin and a Soviet May Day parade. The Rockefellers were not happy with the painting and the incomplete work was eventually destroyed and painted over. Rivera recreated it here in 1934. On the north side of the third floor are David Alfaro Siqueiros' three-part La Nueva Democracia (New Democracy) and Rivera's four-part Carnaval de la Vida Mexicana (Carnival of Mexican Life); to the east is José Clemente Orozco's La Katharsis (Catharsis), depicting the conflict between humankind's 'social' and 'natural' aspects.

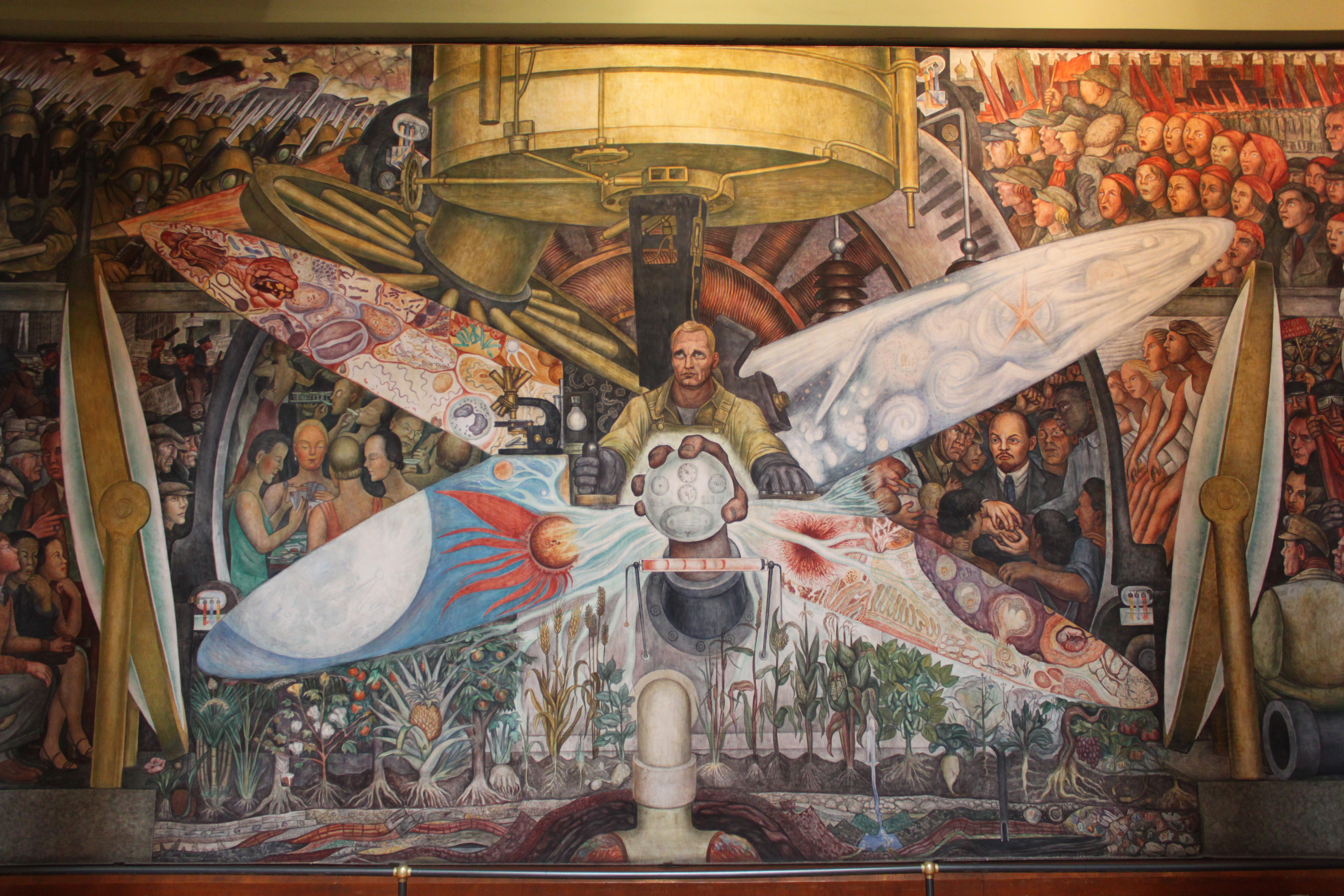
El hombre controlador del universo (Man at the Crossroads), 1934, Rivera

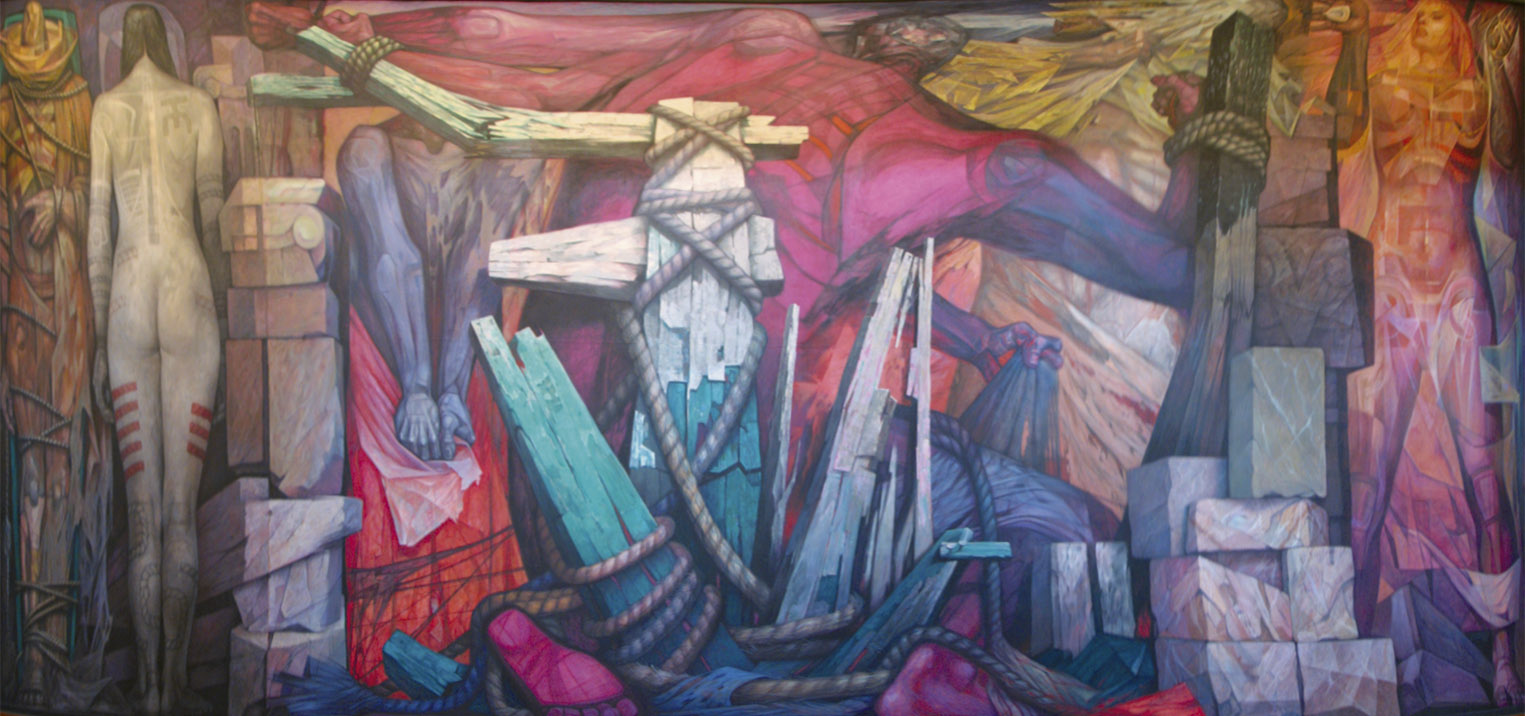
Liberación (Liberation) or La humanidad se libera de la miseria (Humanity is released from Misery), 1963, Jorge González Camarena

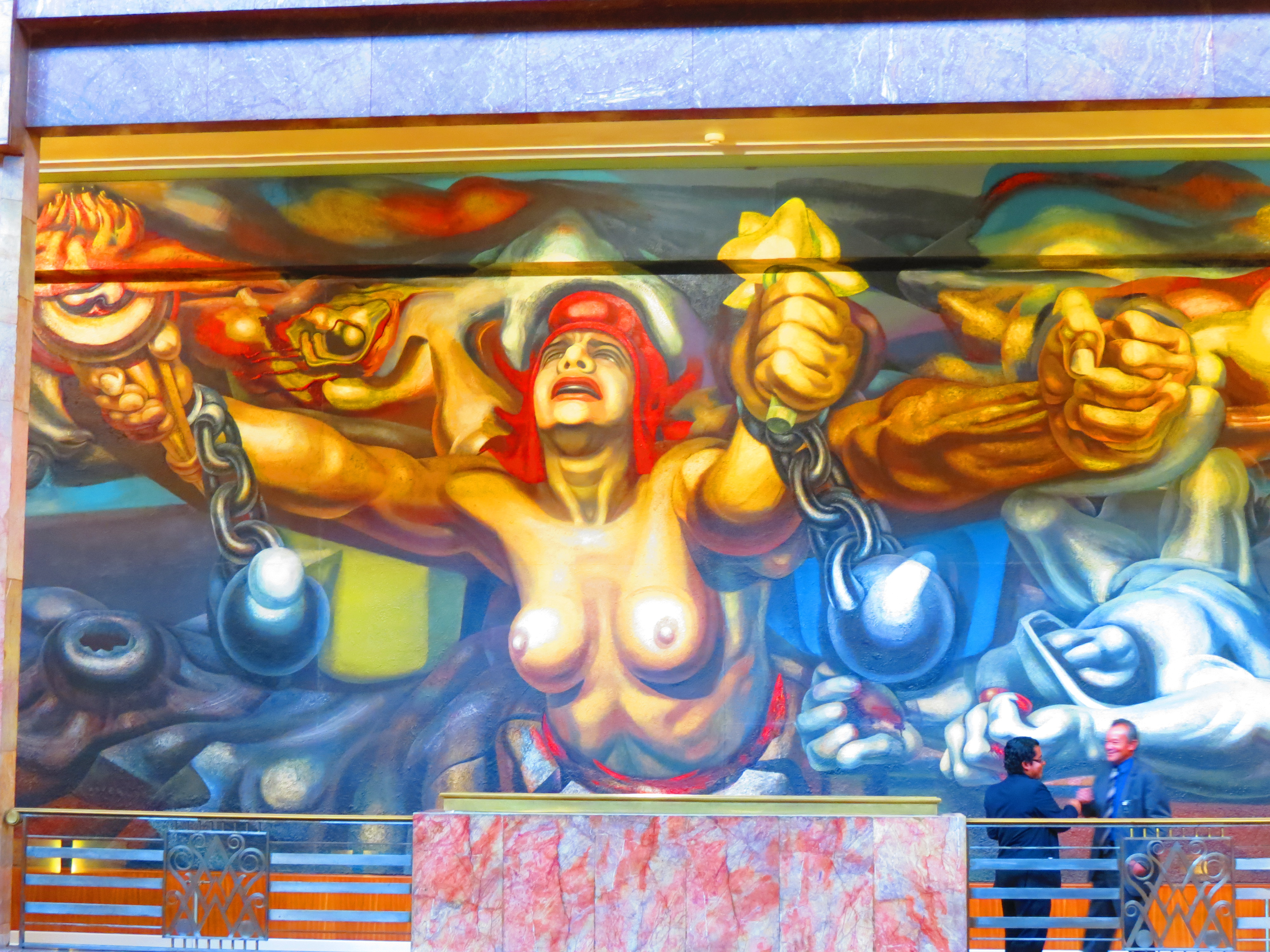
La nueva democracia (The New Democracy), 1945, Siqueiros

== Museo del Palacio de Bellas Artes ==
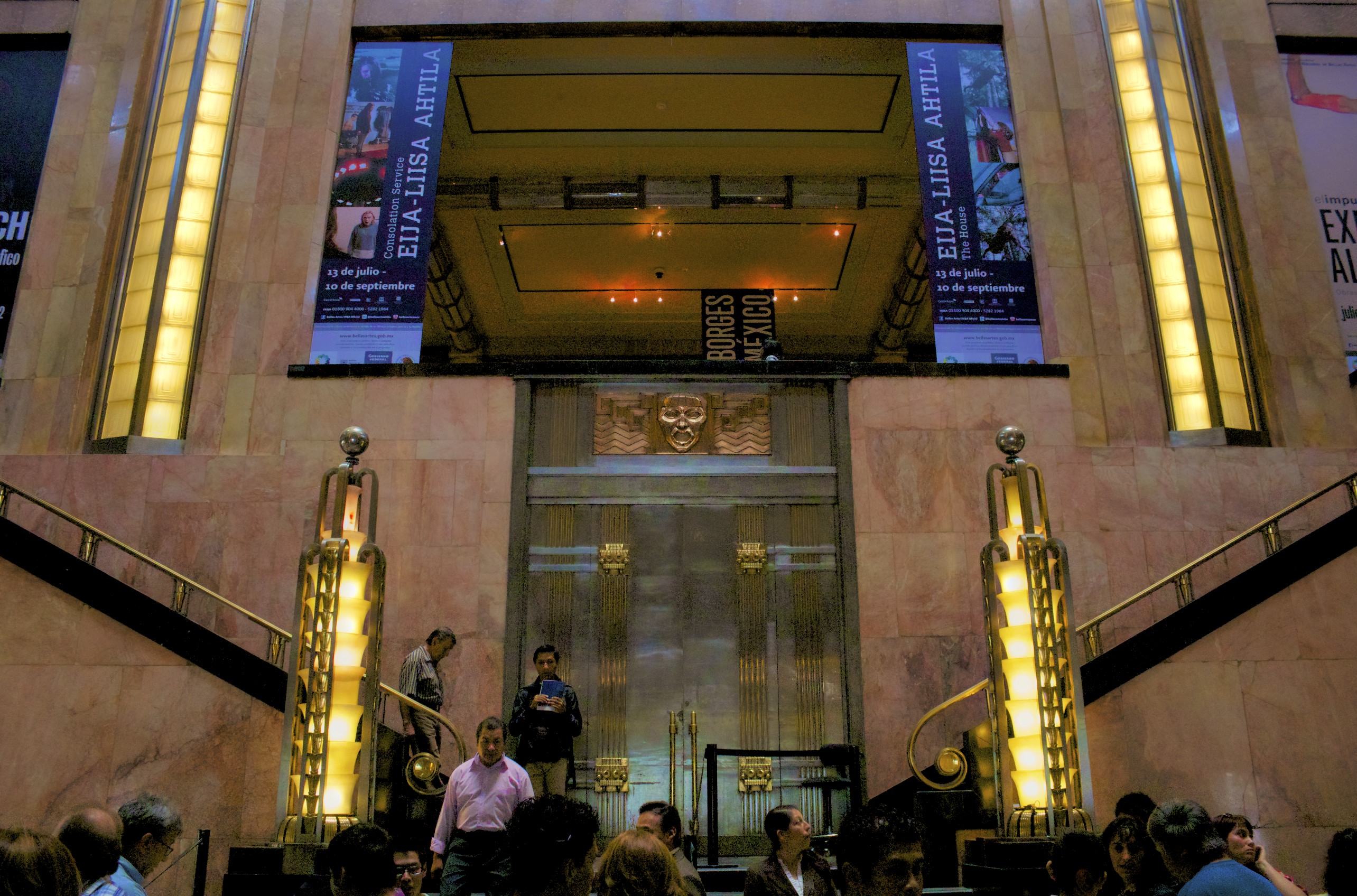
View of the interior art deco

The Museo del Palacio de Bellas Artes (Museum of the Palace of Fine Arts) is the organization that takes care of the permanent murals and other artwork in the building as well as arrange temporary exhibits. These exhibits cover a wide range of media and feature Mexican and international artists, focusing on classic and contemporary artists.

=== Museo Nacional de Arquitectura ===
The Museo Nacional de Arquitectura (Museum of Architecture) occupies the top floor of the building, covered by the glass and iron roof. It contains exhibitions from renowned Mexican architects including models, designs and photographs of major works. The museum also arranges temporary exhibitions of its collections in other facilities to expose the Mexican public to the country's rich architectural heritage. Some of the major architects featured at the museum include Jaime Ortiz Monasterio, Carlos Mijares Bracho, Adamo Boari and Luis Barragán. The museum is divided into four sections called "Arquitectura-contrastes: Jaime Ortiz Monasterio y Carlos Mijares Bracho", "Corpus Urbanístico de la Ciudad de México", "Teatro Nacional de México (Plano original)" and "Teatro Nacional de México." There are also temporary exhibits on contemporary architecture.

== Gallery ==
Exterior views of the Palacio de Bellas Artes

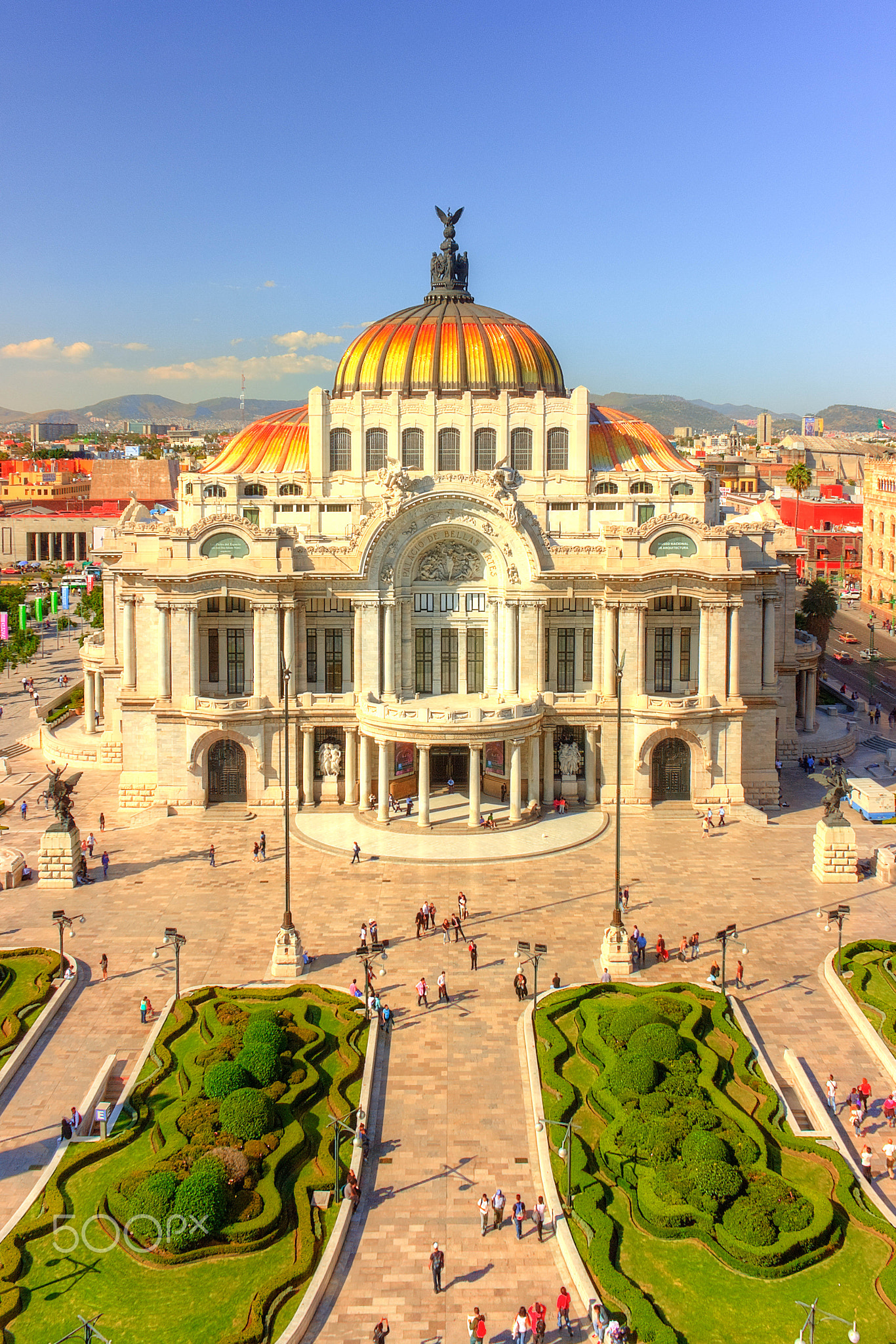
Sunset in the Palacio de Bellas Artes, aerial view

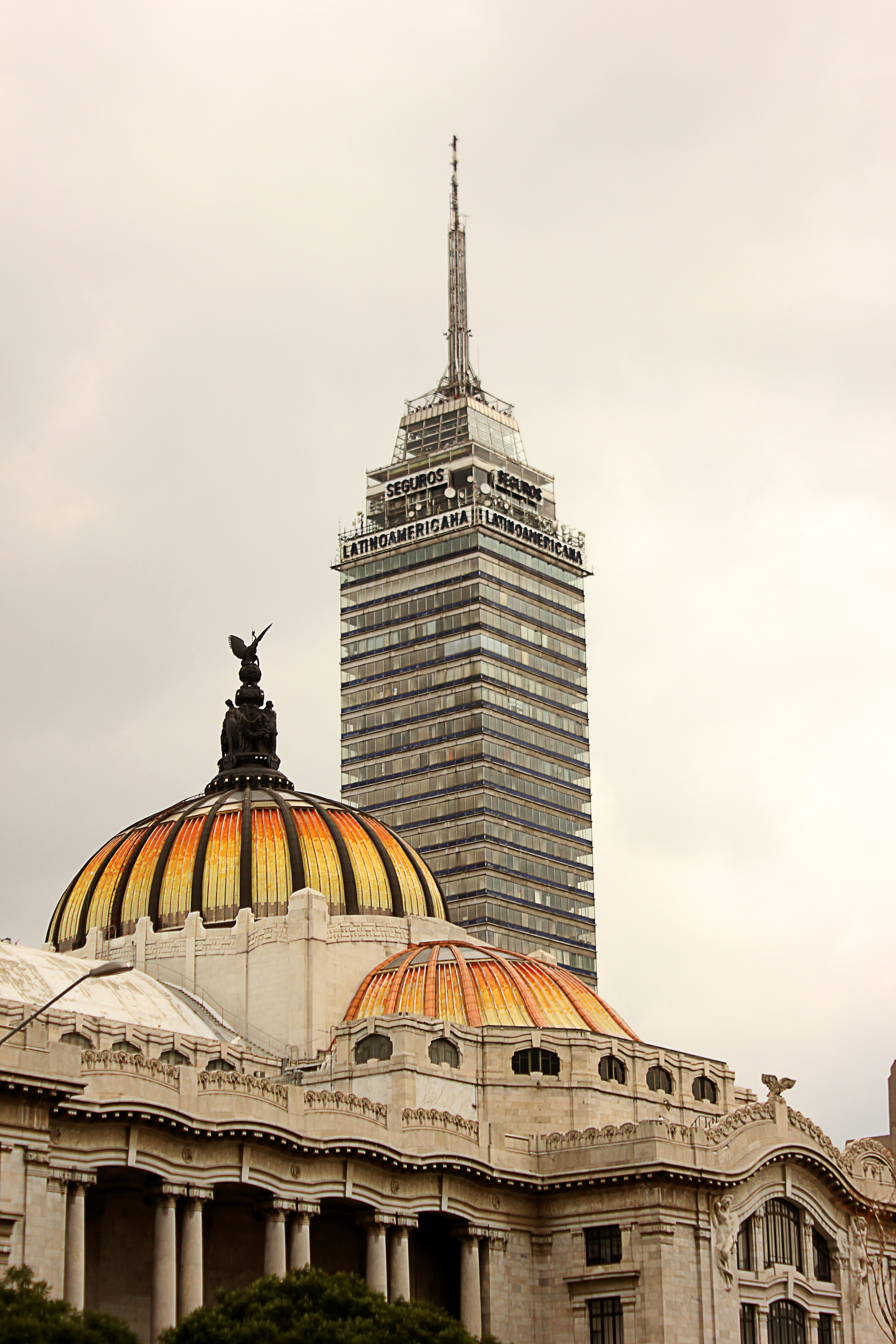
Palacio de Bellas Artes and Torre Latinoamericana

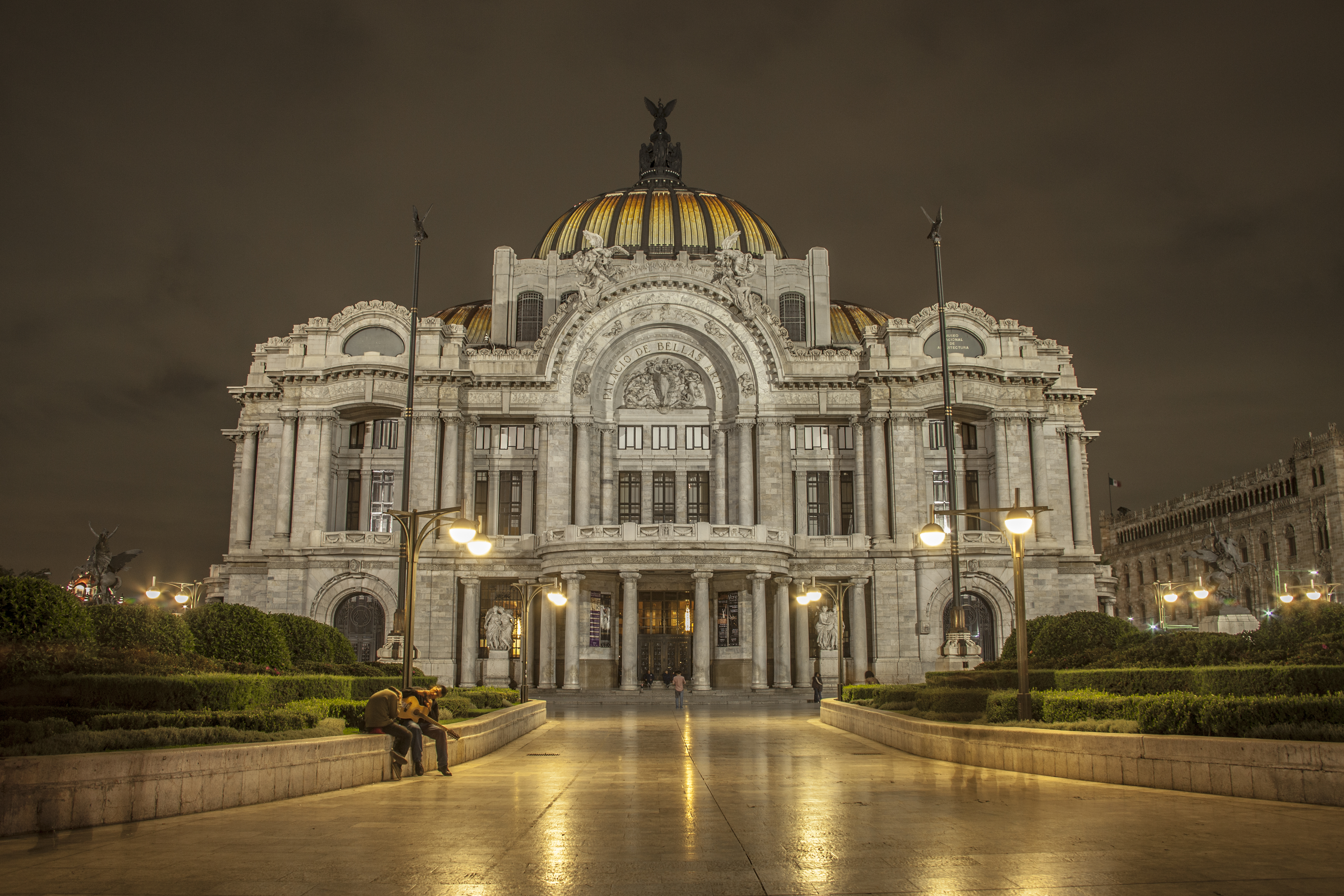
Night view of the Palacio de Bellas Artes

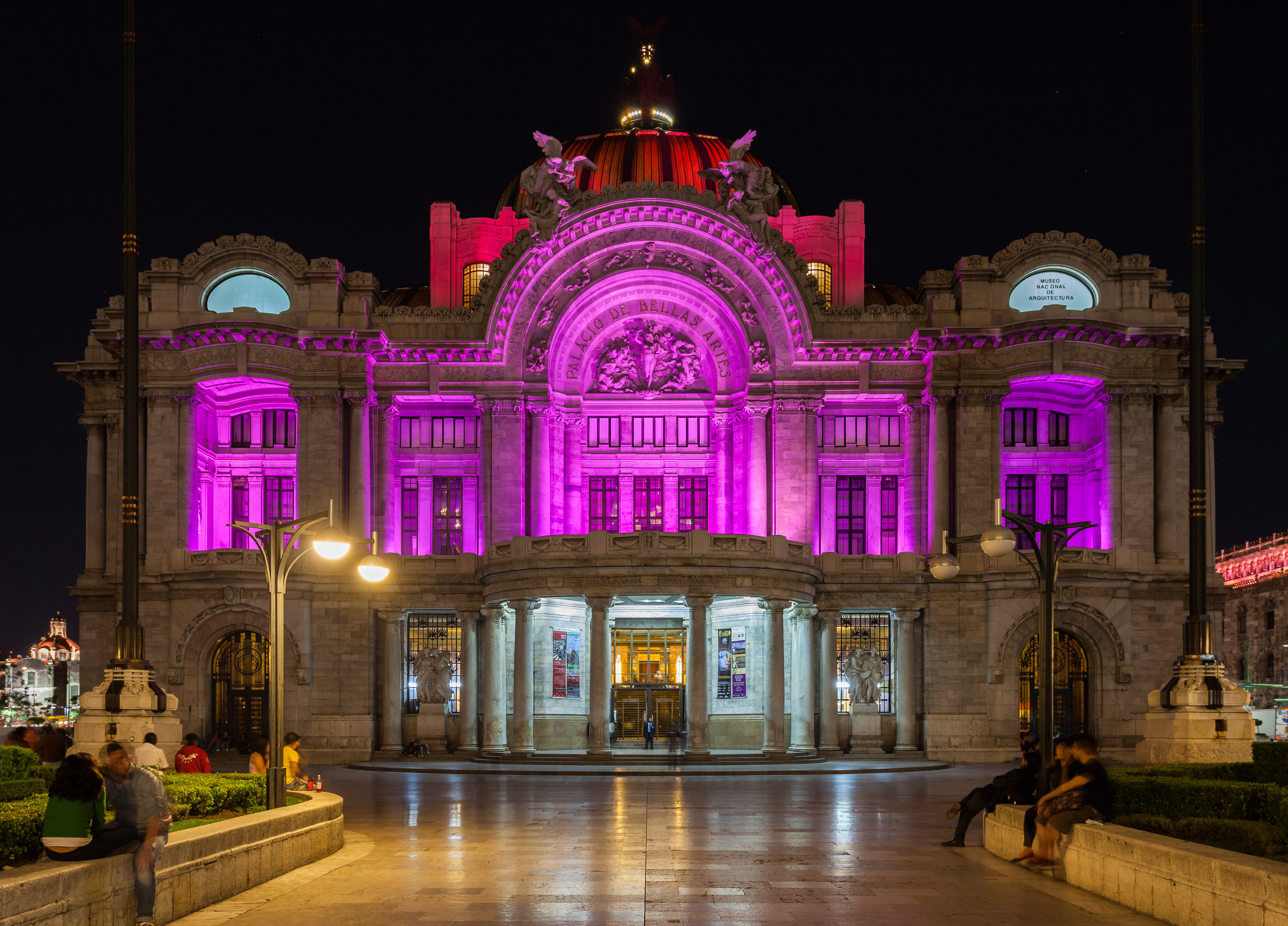
Night view with warm lighting

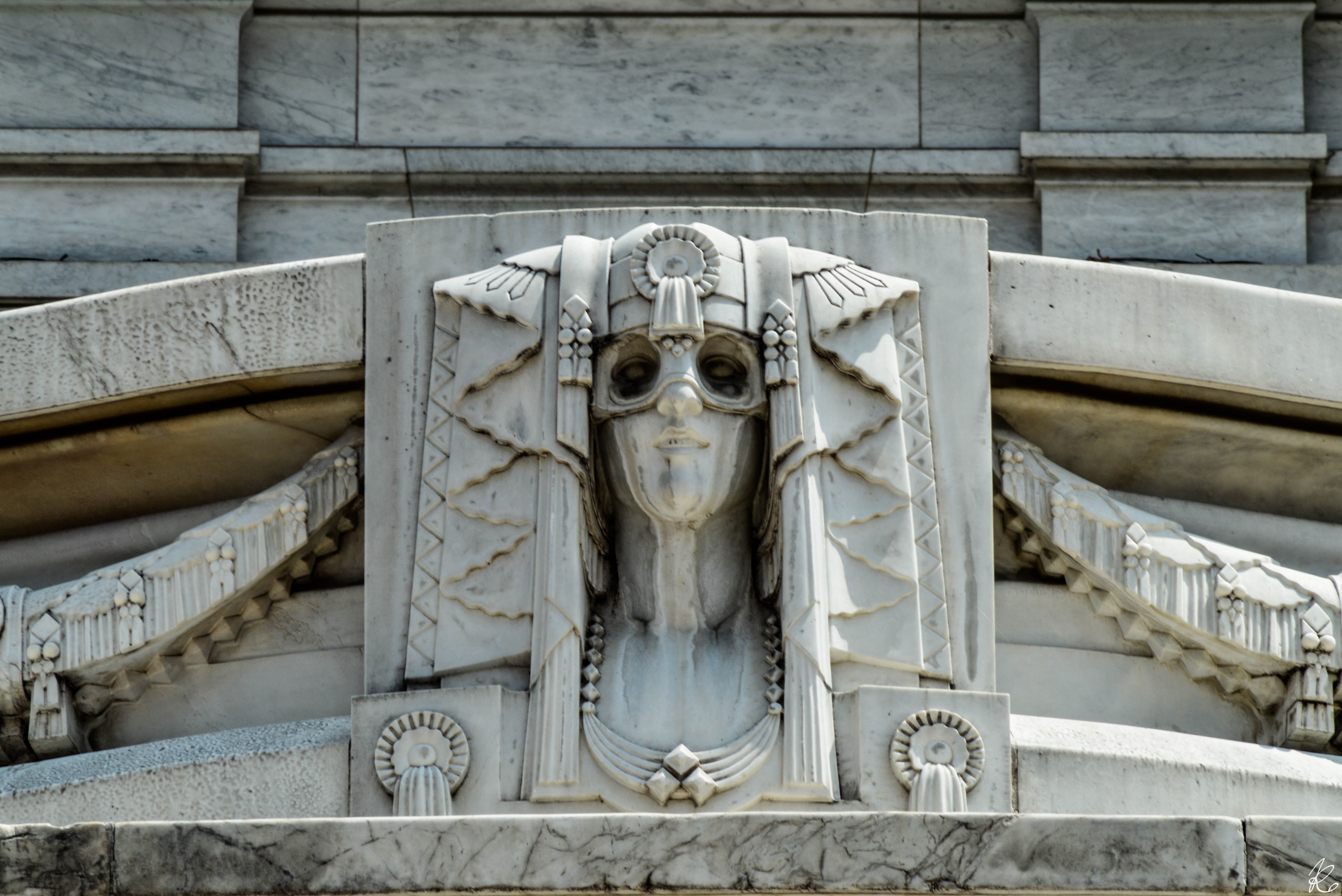
One of the mascarons made by Adamo Boari in the facade

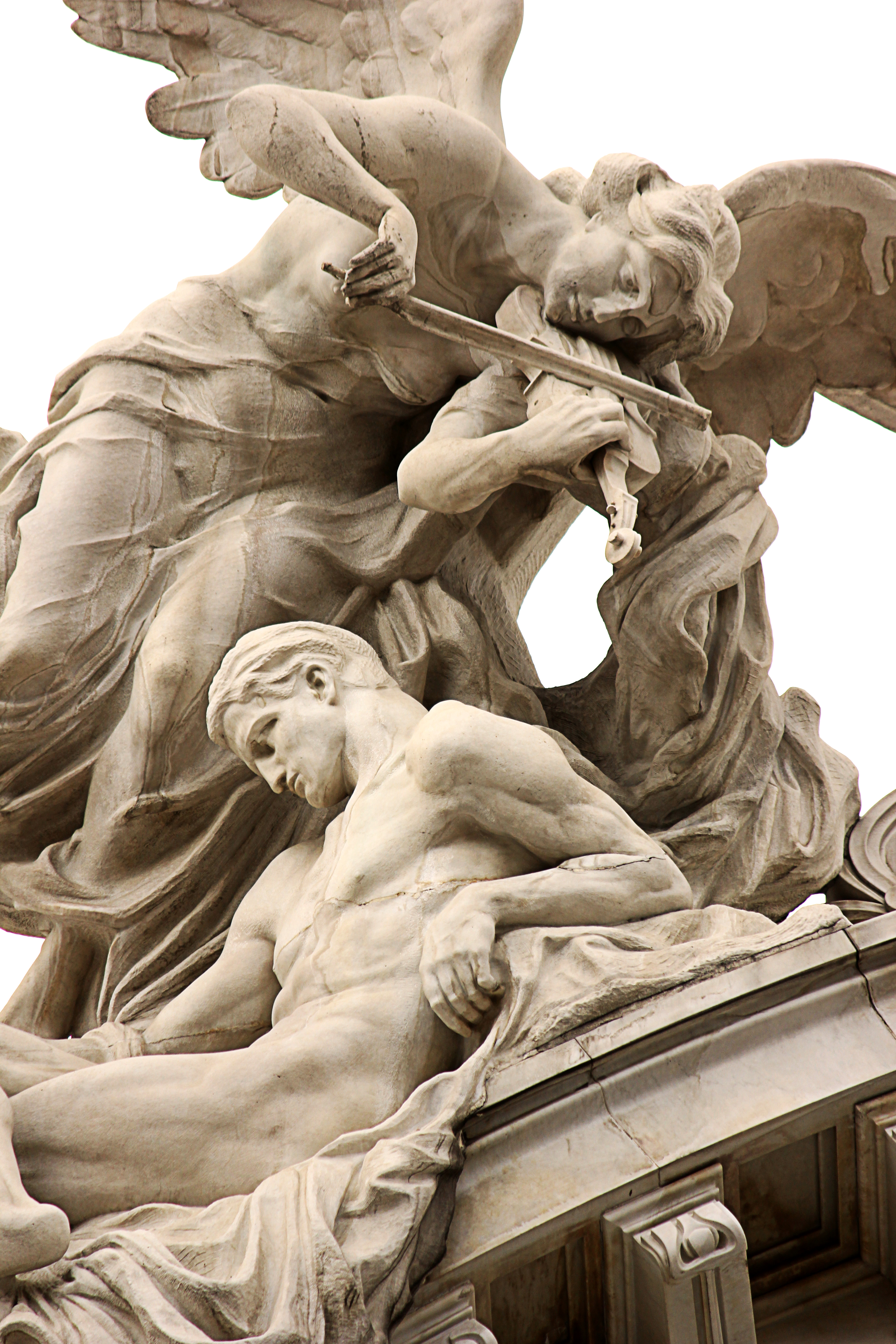
The music, work of Leonardo Bistolfi

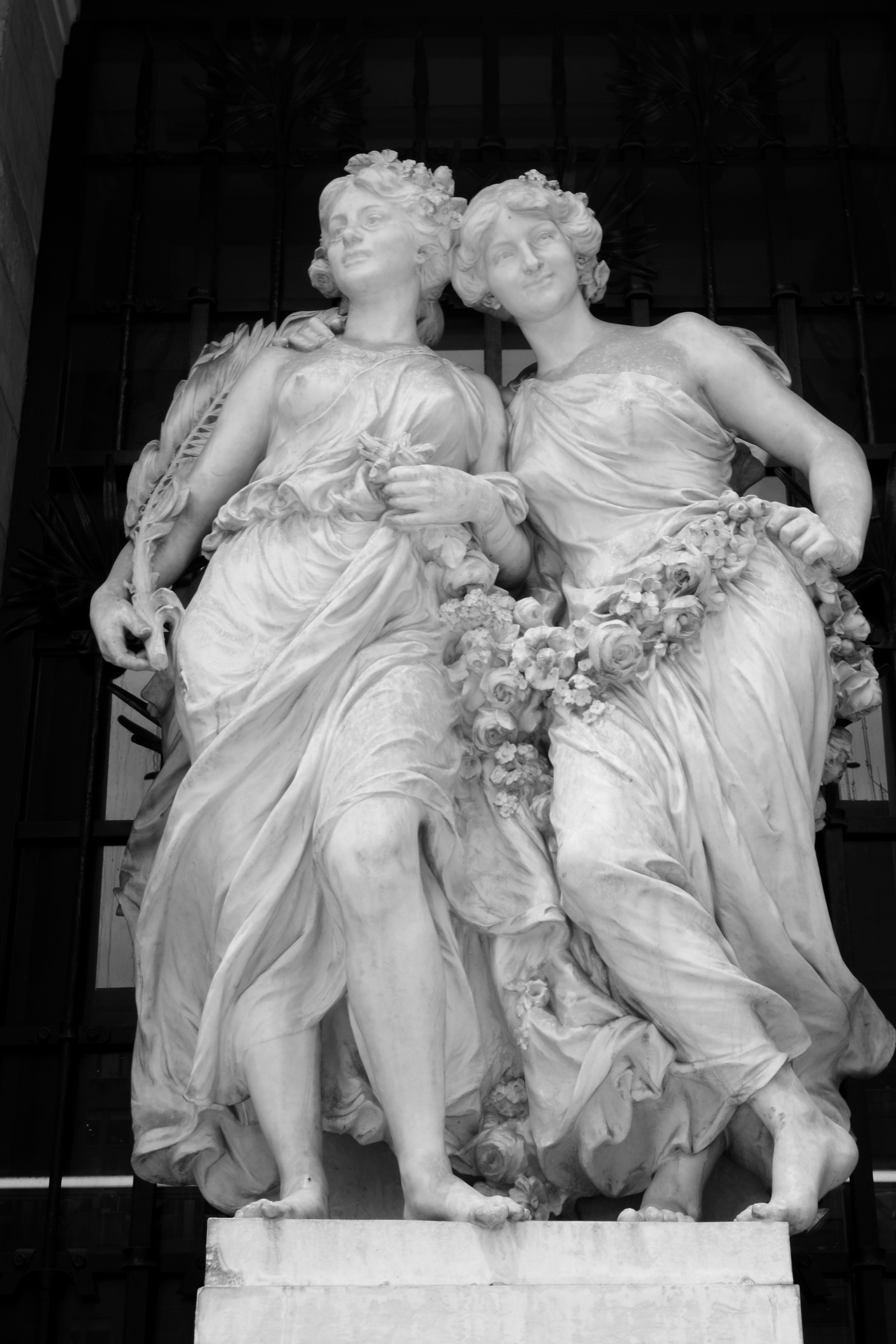
The Virile Age, André-Joseph Allar

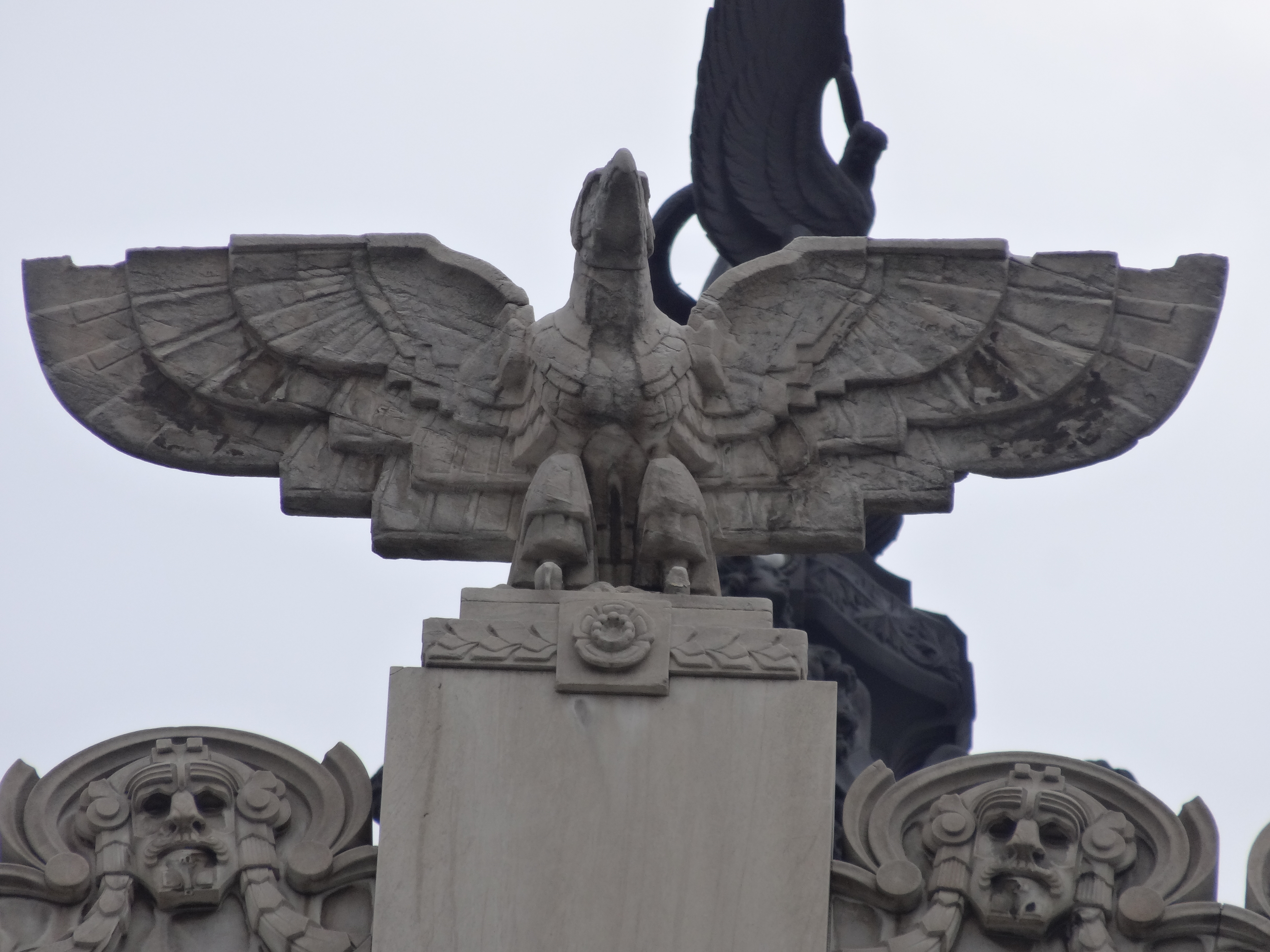
Art Nouveau eagle sculpture
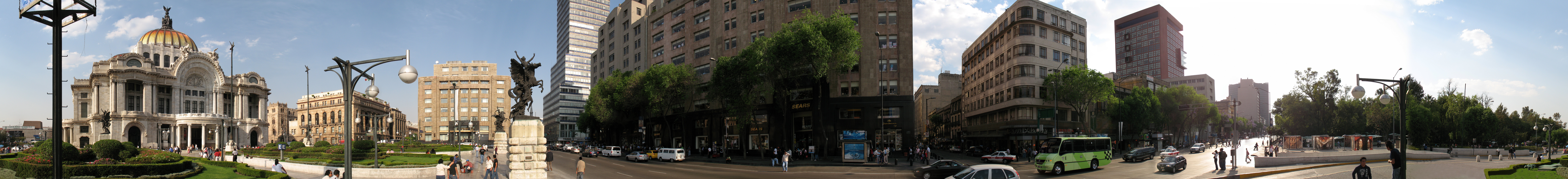
360° panoramic view of Plaza de Bellas Artes in the Historic center of Mexico City. Visible are Teatro Hidalgo, Palacio de Bellas Artes, Palacio Postal, Banco de México, Torre Latinoamericana, Edificio La Nacional, Avenida Juárez, Edificio del Tribunal Superior de Justicia del DF, ex Hotel Bamer, Sheraton Hotel and Alameda Central.
Historical images of the Palacio de Bellas Artes

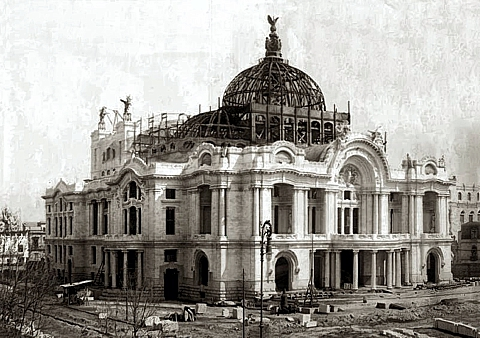
Palacio de Bellas Artes in 1915, under construction

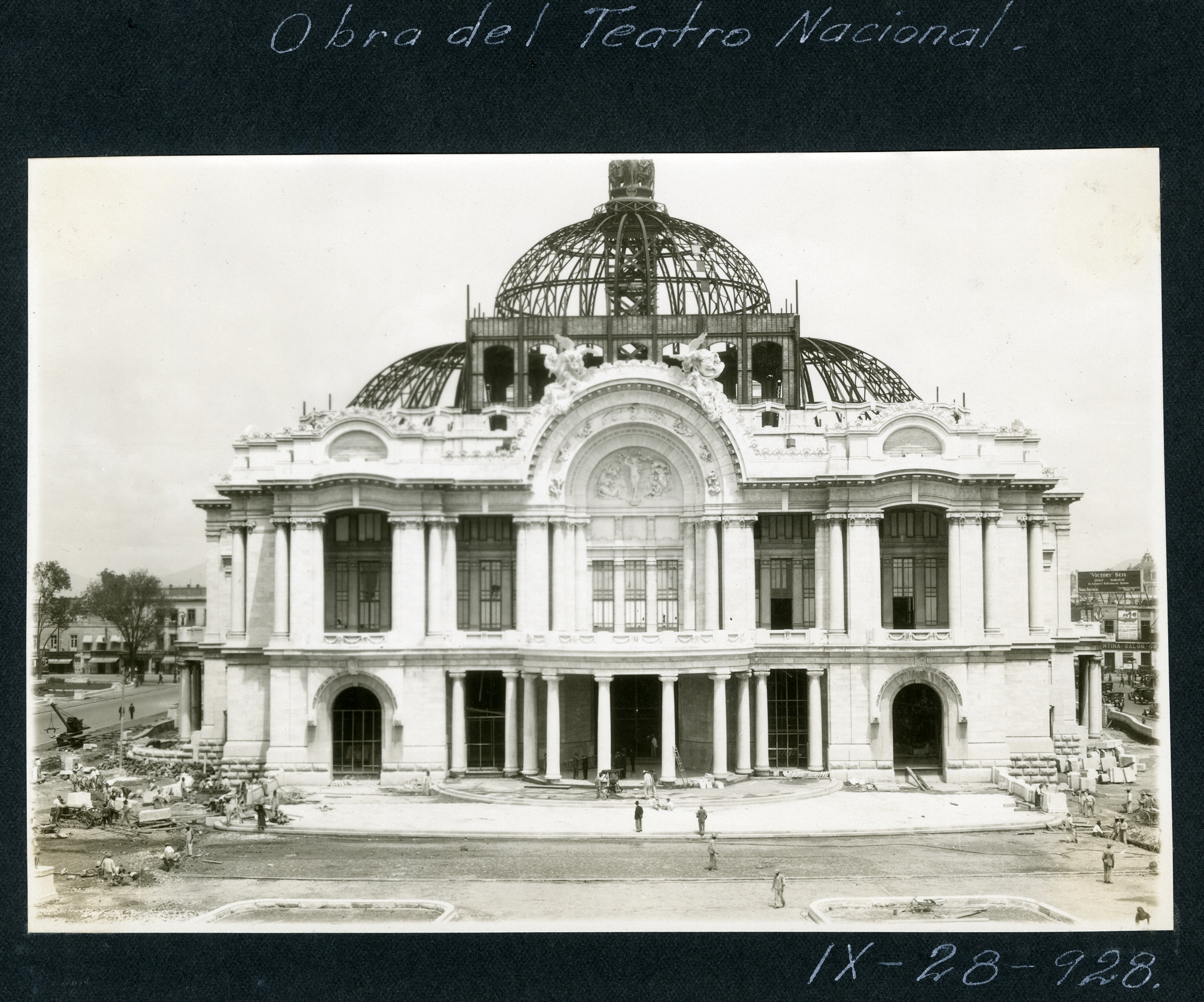
The building during its construction, 1928.

== See also ==
- Auditorio Nacional (Mexico)
