= Lucas Martínez Lara =

Mexican Roman Catholic bishop

- Bishop of Matehuala
- Church: Catholic Church
- Diocese: Diocese of Matehuala
- In office: 5 October 2006 – 9 April 2016
- Predecessor: Rodrigo Aguilar Martínez
- Successor: Margarito Salazar Cárdenas

Orders
- Ordination: 27 October 1968
- Consecration: 14 December 2006 by Luis Morales Reyes

Personal details
- Born: 13 March 1943 Villa de La Paz, San Luis Potosí, Mexico
- Died: 9 April 2016 (aged 73)

Lucas Martínez Lara (13 March 1946 – 9 April 2016) was a Mexican Roman Catholic bishop.

Ordained to the priesthood in 1968, Martinez Lara was named bishop of the Roman Catholic Diocese of Matehuala, Mexico in 2006; he died while still in office.
