= Matehuala Cathedral =

Coordinates: 23.6464°N 100.6444°W

Immaculate Conception Cathedral
- Catedral de la Inmaculada Concepción
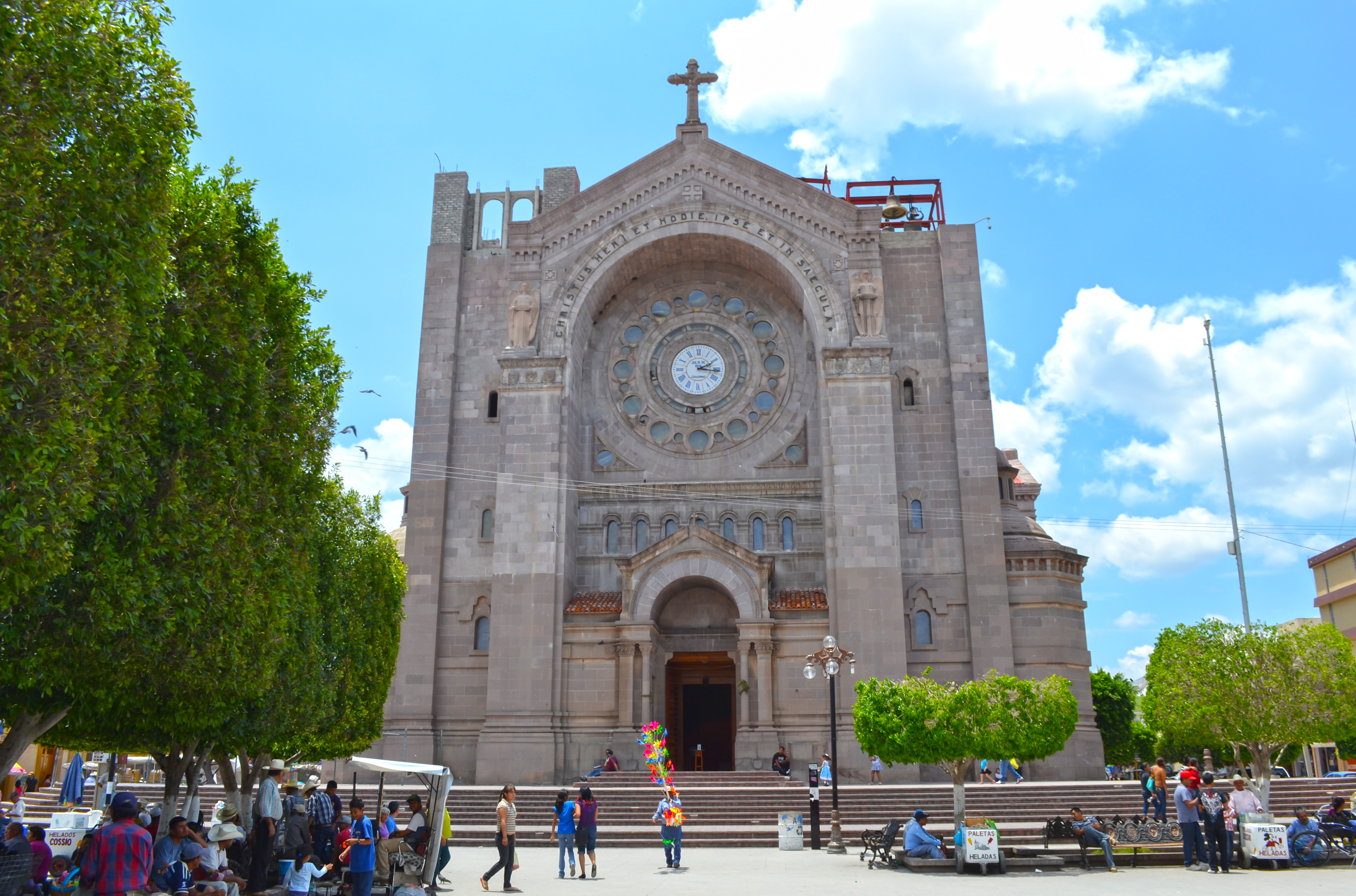
- Immaculate Conception Cathedral
- Location: Matehuala
- Country: Mexico
- Denomination: Roman Catholic Church

The Immaculate Conception Cathedral (Spanish: Catedral de la Inmaculada Concepción), also Matehuala Cathedral, is a Catholic cathedral located in the city of Matehuala, as the see of the Roman Catholic Diocese of Matehuala, in the state of San Luis Potosí in Mexico. Although the cathedral is open for worship, it is still under construction. Its style is neo-Gothic / neo-Byzantine.

The first stone was laid in 1906 with slight variations in its dimensions. The northern ship was the first body to be finished and to be used for religious celebrations, known by the matehualenses as "the ship". In the middle of the twentieth century the first phase of the cathedral's construction was completed at the end of the altar, the south nave and the lateral ones. The cathedral is not yet finished and the towers of the main façade are being built.

This church bears the same architectural style as the Église Saint-Joseph des Brotteaux, in Lyon, France. By January, 1898, the Roman catholic people of the city of Matehuala had asked Jose Maria Ignacio Montes de Oca y Obregón, bishop of the then-Diocese of San Luis Potosí, the demolition of a parish church that threatened collapse. The Bishop asked his good friend president Porfirio Díaz to commission an architect, for building a new temple, being Adamo Boari the initiator of this important church. Boari was based on the plans by Gaspard André, who had built the Saint-Joseph des Brotteaux church in Lyon. However, at the beginning of the construction there was a period –in the year of 1910, during the Mexican Revolution– when the plans were lost.

== See also ==
- Roman Catholicism in Mexico
- Immaculate Conception

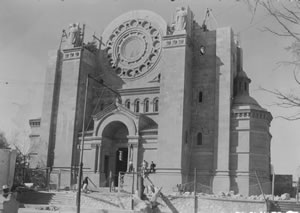
The cathedral before 1910
