= Lucas Martínez (footballer, born 1998) =

Uruguayan footballer

Personal information
- Full name: Lucas Alejandro Martínez Guanco
- Date of birth: 5 November 1998 (age 28)
- Place of birth: Durazno, Uruguay
- Height: 1.66 m (5 ft 5 in)
- Position: Midfielder

Team information
- Current team: Juventud
- Number: 16

Youth career
- 2013–2018: Defensor Sporting

Senior career*
Years	Team	Apps	(Gls)
2018–	Defensor Sporting B		
2019	→ Juventud (loan)	12	(0)
- * Club domestic league appearances and goals as of 21 May 2021

Lucas Alejandro Martínez Guanco (born 5 November 1998) is a Uruguayan footballer who plays as a midfielder for Defensor Sporting B.

== Career ==
=== Juventud ===
In January 2019, Martínez was loaned out to Juventud. He made his debut in the opening match of the season on 16 February, coming on as an 86th-minute substitute for Diego García in a 2-1 defeat to Fénix. He would make a total of 12 appearances during his loan spell before returning to Defensor Sporting.

== Career statistics ==
=== Club ===
As of match played 10 October 2019

Appearances and goals by club, season and competition
Club	Season	League			Cup		Other		Total	
Club	Season	Division	Apps	Goals	Apps	Goals	Apps	Goals	Apps	Goals
Juventud	2019	Uruguayan Primera División	12	0	—	—	—	—	12	0
Career total			12	0	—	—	—	—	12	0
