= Lucas Martínez (footballer, born 1997) =

Chilean footballer

Personal information
- Full name: Lucas Martínez Callegari
- Date of birth: 11 September 1997 (age 29)
- Place of birth: La Serena, Chile
- Height: 1.78 m (5 ft 10 in)
- Position: Forward

Youth career
- Deportes La Serena
- Universidad Católica

Senior career*
Years	Team	Apps	(Gls)
2016	Deportes La Serena	0	(0)
2017–2019	Coquimbo Unido	8	(1)
2019	→ Colchagua (loan)	6	(1)
2020–2021	Deportes Recoleta	25	(4)
2022	Deportivo Lara	24	(5)
Total		63	(11)
- * Club domestic league appearances and goals

Lucas Martínez Callegari (born 11 September 1997) is a Chilean former professional footballer who played as a forward.

== Career ==
A product of Universidad Católica youth system, he took part of the Deportes La Serena squad in 2016.

In 2017, he joined Coquimbo Unido, where he made his professional debut and won the 2018 Primera B. After stints with Colchagua and Deportes Recoleta, with whom he won the 2021 Segunda División Profesional, he moved to Venezuela and joined Deportivo Lara in the top level.

He retired at the end of the 2022 season to go on his studies in business management.

== Personal life ==
Due to his Italian heritage, Martínez holds Italian citizenship.

== Honours ==
Coquimbo Unido

- Primera B: 2018

Deportes Recoleta

- Segunda División Profesional: 2021
