= Adamo Boari =

Italian architect

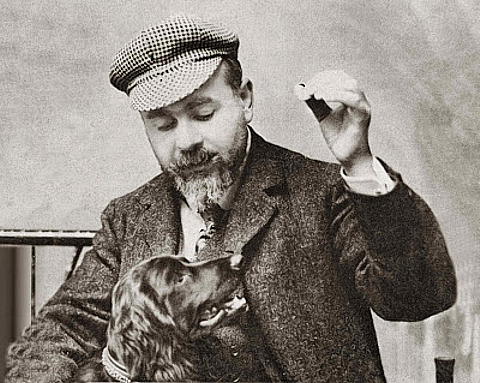
- Architect Adamo Boari and his dog at the early 20th century
- Born: 22 October 1863; Ferrara
- Died: 24 February 1928 (aged 64); Rome
- Education: University of Ferrara, University of Bologna
- Occupation: Architect

Adamo Boari (22 October 1863 – 24 February 1928) was an Italian Art Nouveau and Art Deco civil engineer and architect, he had a very active career in Mexico and he is known for the construction of notable Historicist architectural works in this country.

== Life ==
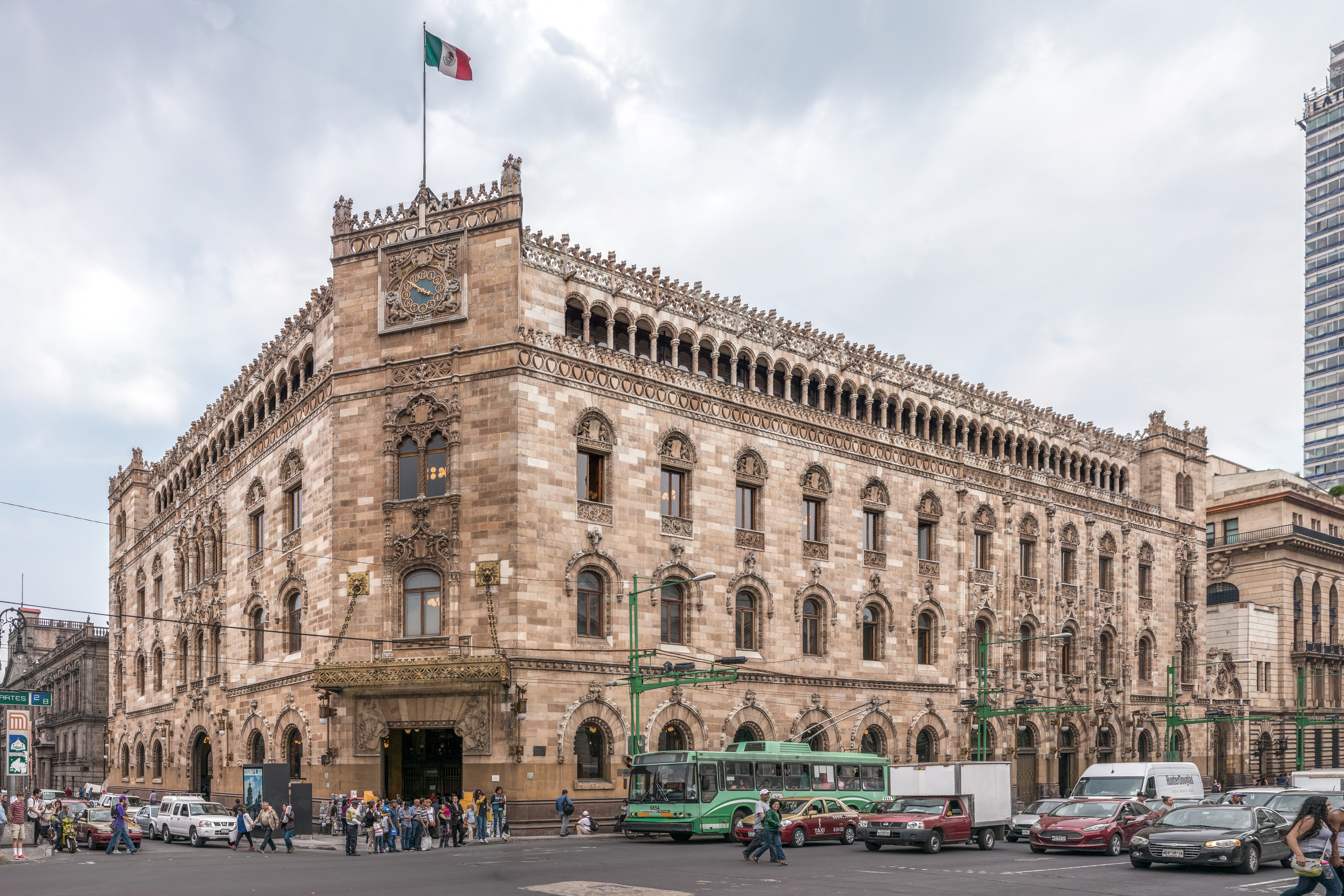
Palacio Postal or Palacio de Correos Mexico City

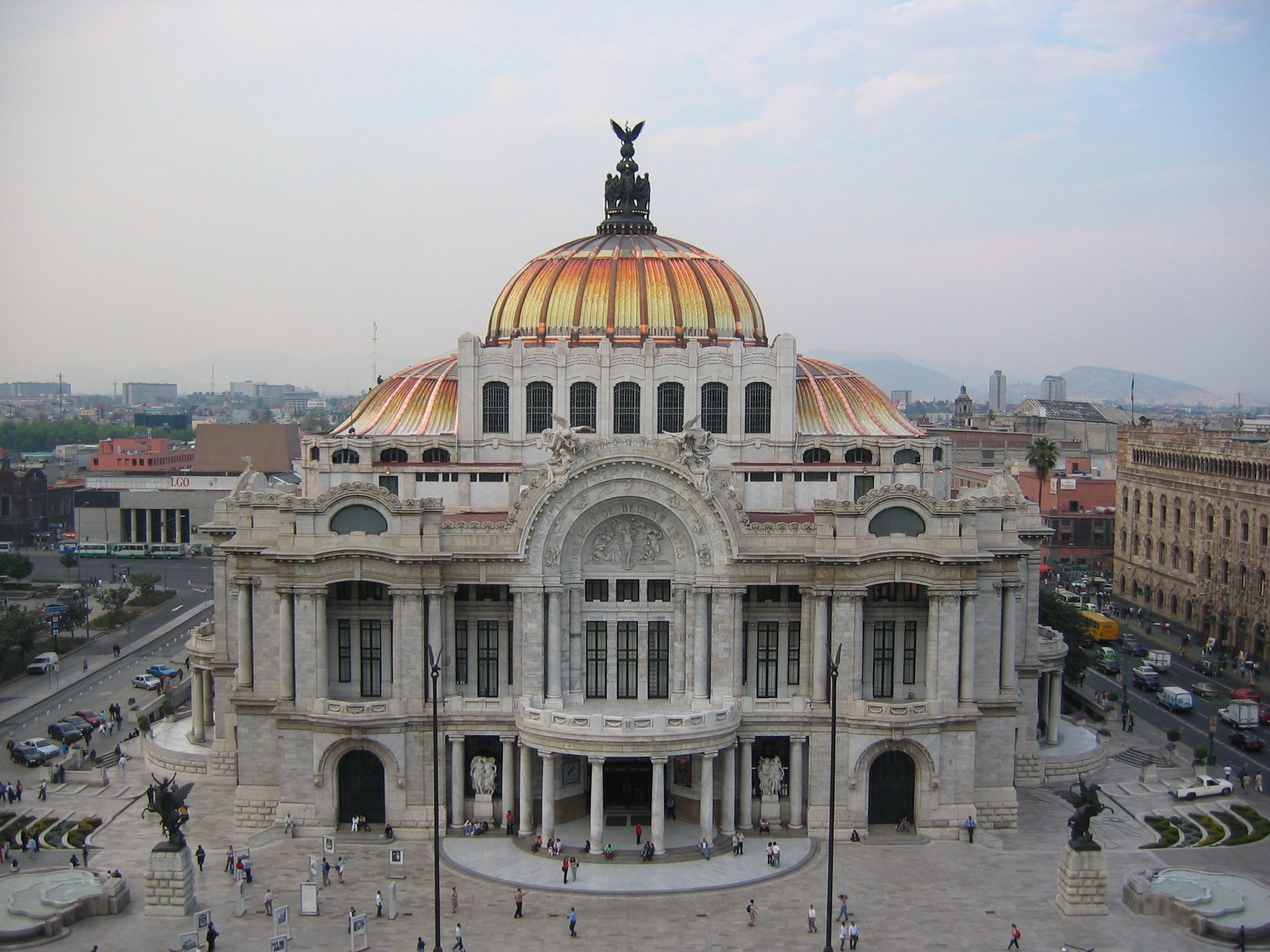
Palacio de Bellas Artes Mexico City

Boari was born in Ferrara. He studied at the University of Ferrara and afterwards at the University of Bologna where he graduated in 1886.

After he had done several works for the National Exhibition of architecture in Turin. He went to Brazil in 1889 where he works as Project Manager for a Universal Exhibition. After visiting the country and some other cities in different countries of South America like Buenos Aires and Montevideo and after recovering from yellow fever he went to the United States where he lived in Chicago. In 1899 he got permission to work in the United States as an architect.

In 1903 he went to Mexico, where under the regime of President Porfirio Díaz, and for which he is invited, he carries out several projects, among which it highlights: the Cathedral of Matehuala (1898), the Templo Expiatorio del Santísimo Sacramento in Guadalajara (1899) and a monument to Porfirio Díaz (1900). It is very probable that he designed the Church of San Antonio Limón in the state of Veracruz. He also designed his house, which was located in the Colonia Roma of Mexico City and was demolished in 1940.

In the Mexican capital, he works on projects that give him fame and recognition, such as: the Palacio de Correos de México and the Palacio de Bellas Artes. It was to this last building that he devoted the most time, working on it even after the Mexican Revolution (1916) had begun. Some of his works he did at the bureau of Frank Lloyd Wright. The Palacio de Correos was finished in 1907. Although Boari began with the construction of the Palacio de Bellas Artes in 1901 he could not finish his work due to the upcoming revolution and resulting technical and financial problems.

In 1916, he returned to Italy and settled in Rome, often traveling to Ferrara. It is mentioned that from Rome he sent contributions and ideas for the completion of the Palacio de Bellas Artes, and that he wrote a book on the construction and design of theatres. It is thought that he supported his brother Sesto Boari for the project of the Nuovo teatro di Ferrara (New theatre of Ferrara), which bears a certain resemblance to that of the aforementioned Mexican fine arts palace. Boari died in Rome on 24 February 1928. The Palacio de Bellas Artes was finished after his death.
