= Matehuala =

- City and municipality
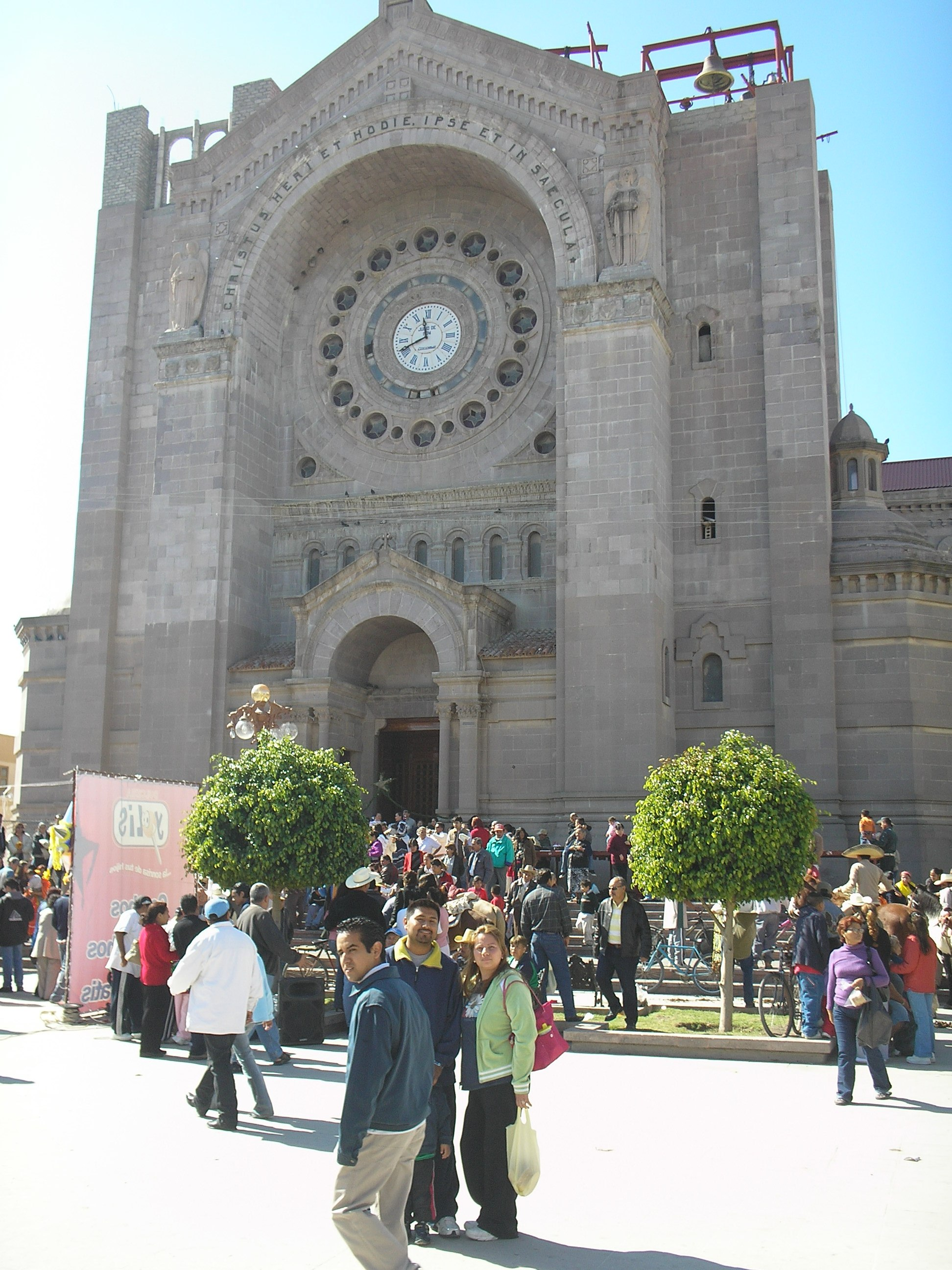
- Cathedral of the Immaculate Conception in Matehuala

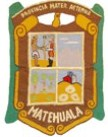
- Coat of arms

- Location within San Luis Potosí Location within Mexico
- Coordinates: 23°39′10″N 100°38′40″W
- Country: Mexico
- State: San Luis Potosí

Area
  - Municipality: 1,302 km^{2} (503 sq mi)
  - City: 23.20 km^{2} (8.96 sq mi)

Population (2020 census)
  - Municipality: 102,199
  - Density: 78.49/km^{2} (203.3/sq mi)
  - City: 86,686
  - City density: 3,736/km^{2} (9,677/sq mi)
- Time zone: UTC-6 (Zona Centro)

Matehuala is a city in the Mexican state of San Luis Potosí, situated at an elevation of about 1,500 m. Matehuala is also the municipal seat of the municipality of the same name, located in the northern part of the state, on the border with the southwestern corner of Nuevo León. The municipality of Matehuala has a population of 102,199 and an area of 1,302 km^{2} (503 sq mi).

== History ==
=== Pre-Colonial ===
Prior to the arrival of the Spanish, the Potosi Plateau region was inhabited by the indigenous Guachichiles, a group of Chichimeca peoples who occupied the southern and central portions of the Mexican Plateau. A nomadic people, they generally lived in small mobile villages and were primarily hunter-gatherers, making them experts of the local herbs and vegetation in the arid region.

The Guachichiles were known as fierce warriors.

=== Colonial ===
Some sources claim that the name "Matehuala" was derived from a warning war cry of the Guachichiles that translates to "do not come [here]!"

In the early 16th century, Spanish expeditions sought metals and mining opportunities in the Altiplano region. Captain Gabriel Ortiz de Fuenmayor and a contingent of soldiers, adventurers, and missionaries entered from Zacatecas, founding San Francisco de Matehuala in 1550. The Chichimec War erupted in 1549, lasting 40 years, causing the abandonment of Matehuala. Viceroy Luis de Velasco organized expeditions between 1551 and 1553 to end the war, using allies to settle for peace and create settlements.

The conflict continued until 1568 when frontier presidios were established. King Philip II sought peace negotiations, leading to conferences attended by indigenous leaders. In 1638, Matehuala's possession changed hands due to language barriers. By the 17th century, mineral discoveries boosted Matehuala's economy.

In 1706, the town's second founding occurred after a commission verified land ownership. In 1786, New Spain was divided into intendancies, including San Luis Potosí. In 1799, a parish was established in Matehuala, although conflicts between Spaniards and indigenous people resurfaced due to fees for newcomers. The mining boom in Real de Catorce led to economic growth in Matehuala. Finally, in 1808, Matehuala was designated a villa, marking a significant historical event.

== Government ==
=== Municipal presidents ===
| Term | Municipal president | Political party | Notes |
|---|---|---|---|
| 1896 | Mariano Vázquez López | | |
| 1939–1940 | Octaviano Briones Cortez | PRM | |
| 1940 | Antonio Verástegui Cruz | PRM | |
| 1940–1943 | Nicolás López Loera | PRM | |
| 1943–1945 | Miguel Ángel Santos | PRM | |
| 1945 | Nicolás López Loera | PRM | |
| 1945–1946 | Horacio Medellín Cruz | PRM | |
| 1946–1949 | Roberto Alderete Aguilar | PRI | |
| 1949–1952 | Nicolás Sánchez Pérez | PRI | |
| 1952–1955 | Enrique de la Cruz Zepeda | PRI | |
| 1955–1958 | Santiago J. Vivanco Castillo | PRI | |
| 1958–1961 | Jesús Pérez Barba | PRI | |
| 1961–1964 | Antonio Nava Sánchez | PRI | |
| 1964–1967 | Adalberto Tamayo López | PRI | |
| 1967–1970 | Alfonso Dibildox Martínez | PRI | |
| 1970–1973 | Eduardo Rocha Pérez | PRI | |
| 1973–1976 | Tomás Zárate Sánchez | PRI | |
| 1976–1979 | José Mahbub Matta | PRI | |
| 1979–1982 | Antonio Ávila Lomas | PRI | |
| 1982–1985 | José Nava Sánchez | PRI | |
| 1985–1988 | Pascual Gallegos Montalvo | PRI | |
| 1988–1991 | Virgilio Castillo Andrade | PRI | |
| 1991–1994 | Paulino Martínez Carmona | PRI | |
| 1994–1997 | Justo Fernando Torres Rangel | PAN | |
| 1997–2000 | Raymundo García Olivares | PRI | |
| 2000–2003 | Gregorio Antonino Maldonado Vázquez | PAN | |
| 2003–2006 | José Everardo Nava Gómez | PRI; PVEM | |
| 2006–2009 | Víctor Manuel Mendoza Ramírez | PAN | |
| 2009–2012 | Francisco Javier Hernández Loera | PAN; Panal | |
| 2012 | Édgar Morales Pérez | PRI; PVEM | Municipal president-elect. Never in office. Was assassinated on 12 August 2012 |
| 2012–2015 | Héctor Fermín Ávila Lucero | PRI; PVEM | Substitute. He was appointed municipal president by the City Council of Matehuala |
| 2015–2018 | José Everardo Nava Gómez | PRI; PVEM; Panal | |
| 2018–2021 | Roberto Alejandro Segovia Hernández | PVEM; Panal | |
| 2021–11-11-2023 | Iván Noé Estrada Guzmán | PAN; PRI; PRD; PCP | He was arrested on 11 November 2023 for abusive exercise of power and alleged links with drug barons |
| 21-11-2023–2024 | Franco Coronado Guerra | PAN; PRI; PRD; PCP | Acting municipal president |
| 01-10-2024– | Raúl Ortega Rodríguez | PAN; PRI; PRD | |

== Notable people ==
- Juan José Ortega, film director and producer (1904–1996)
- Octavio Medellín, artist and sculptor (1907–1999)

== Notable buildings ==
- The Cathedral of the Immaculate Conception in Matehuala has the same architectural style as the Church of Saint Joseph des Brotteaux, in Lyon, France. Its construction started in 1898 and was never finished.
- Iglesia Santísima de Guadalupe
