= Plateresque =

Artistic and architectural movement

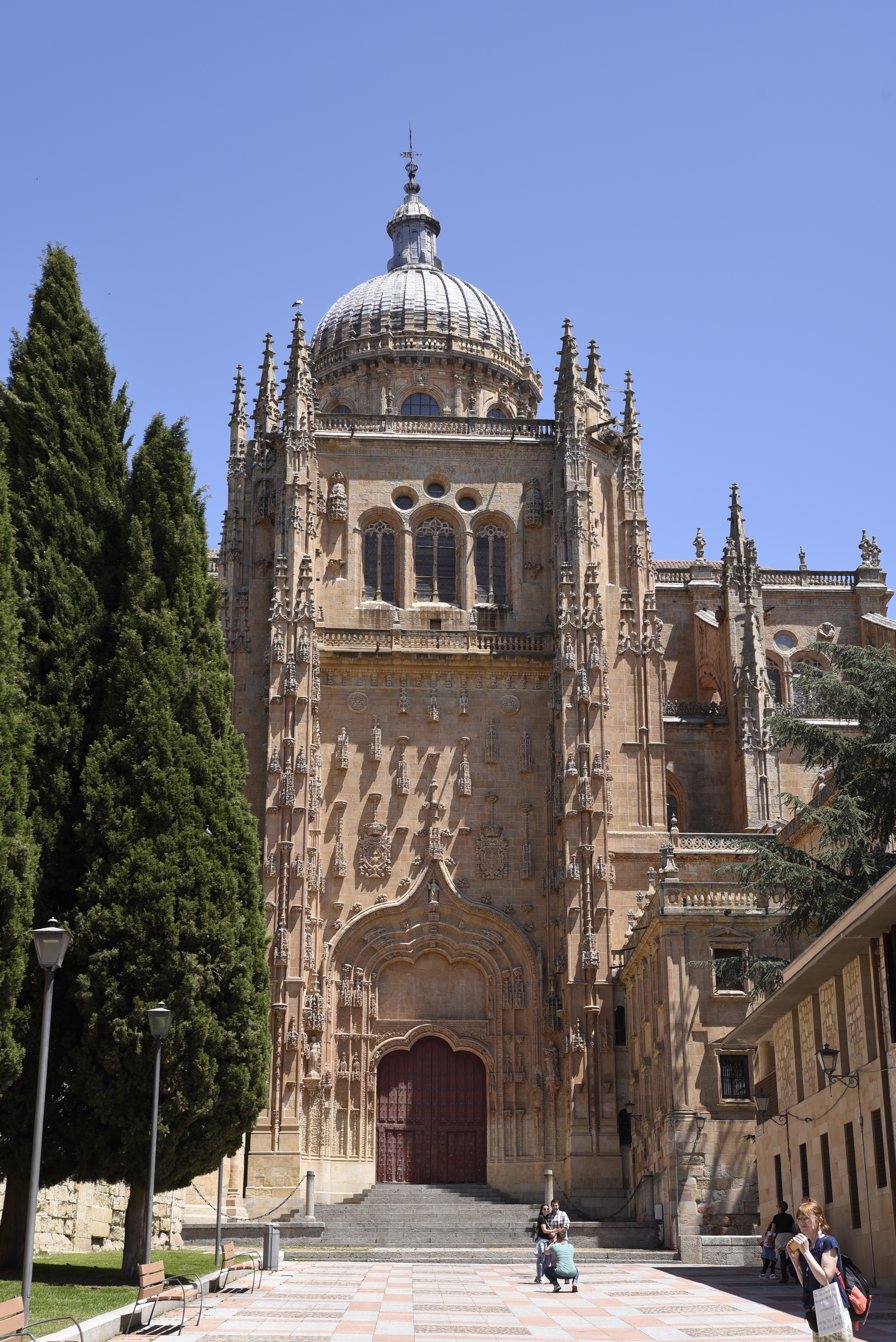
New Cathedral of Salamanca (1513-1733) in the Plateresque made city of Salamanca, Castile and León, Spain

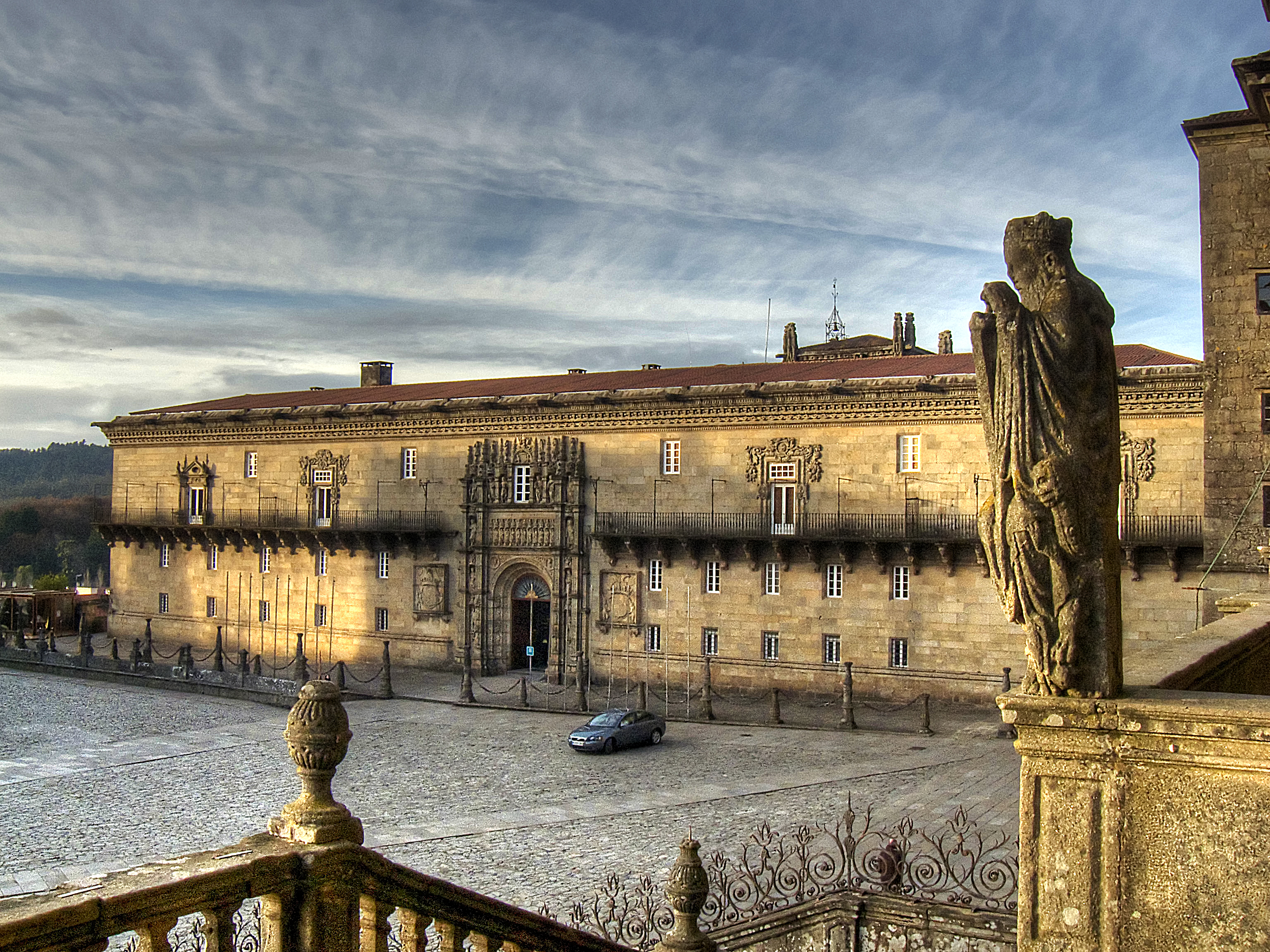
Hospital of the Catholic Monarchs (1501-1511), in Santiago de Compostela, Galicia, Spain

Plateresque, meaning "in the manner of a silversmith" (plata being silver in Spanish), was an artistic movement, especially architectural, developed in Spain and its territories, which appeared between the late Gothic and early Renaissance in the late 15th century and spread over the next two centuries. It is a modification of Gothic spatial concepts and an eclectic blend of Mudéjar, Flamboyant, Gothic, and Lombard decorative components, as well as Renaissance elements of Tuscan origin.

Examples of this syncretism are the inclusion of shields and pinnacles on façades, columns built in the Renaissance neoclassical manner, and façades divided into three parts (in Renaissance architecture they are divided into two). It reached its peak during the reign of Charles V, Holy Roman Emperor, especially in Salamanca, but also flourished in other such cities of the Iberian Peninsula as León, Burgos, Santiago de Compostela, also in the territory of New Spain, which is now Mexico, and in Bogotá.

Plateresque has been considered down to current times a Renaissance style by many scholars. To others, it is its own style, and sometimes receives the designation of Protorenaissance. Some even call it First Renaissance in a refusal to consider it as a style in itself, but to distinguish it from non-Spanish Renaissance works.

The style is characterized by ornate decorative façades covered with floral designs, chandeliers, festoons, fantastic creatures and all sorts of configurations. The spatial arrangement, however, is more clearly Gothic-inspired. This fixation on specific parts and their spacing, without structural changes of the Gothic pattern, causes it to be often classified as simply a variation of Renaissance style. In New Spain the Plateresque acquired its own configuration, clinging tightly to its Mudéjar heritage and blending with Native American influences.

In Spain its development is most remarkable in the city of Salamanca although examples are found in most regions of the country.

In the 19th century with the rise of historicism, the Plateresque architectural style was revived under the name of Monterrey Style.

== Etymology ==
The term Plateresque came from the silversmith trade. Diego Ortiz de Zúñiga used it for the first time, applying it to the Royal Chapel of the Cathedral of Seville in the 17th century.

== Problems of geographical area and consideration as Style ==
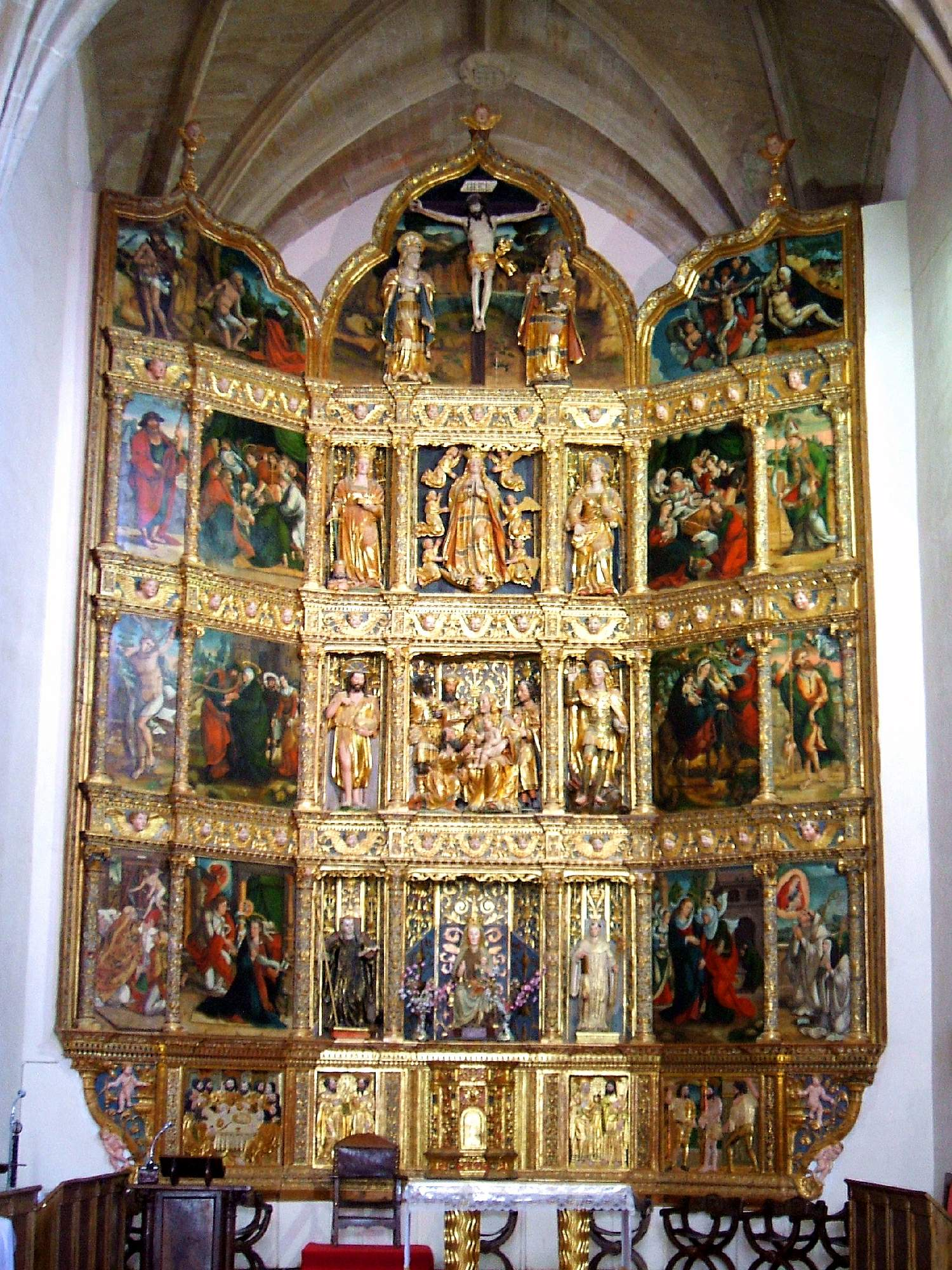
Altar plateresque of the Cistercian monastery of Santa María del Salvador, in Cañas, La Rioja, Spain

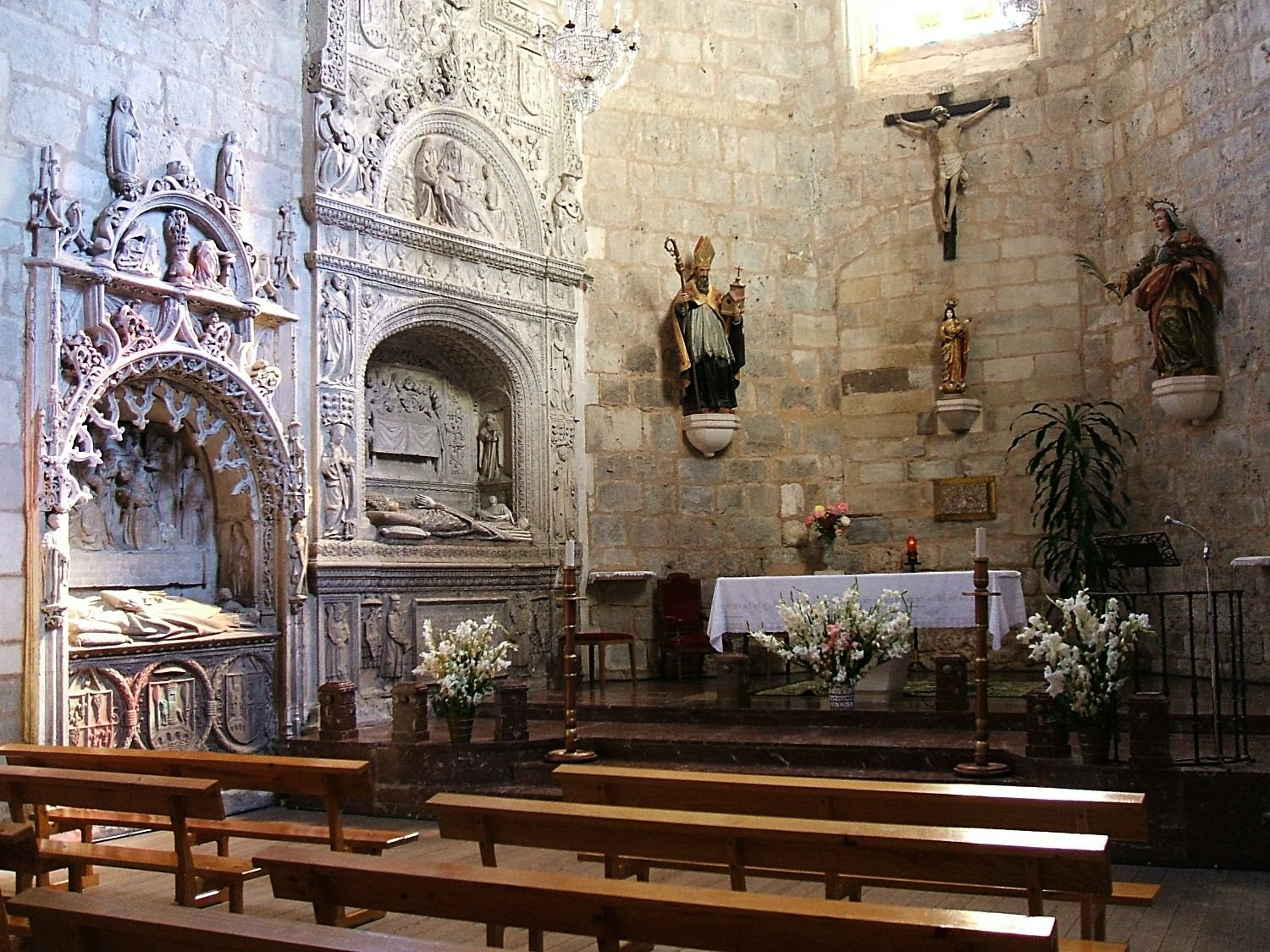
Plateresque tomb of the Saint Juan de Ortega, next to another tomb of late Gothic style, in the Convento de Santa Dorotea (15th century), in Burgos, Castile and León, Spain

Traditionally Plateresque has been considered a style exclusively "Spanish", a term also applied to architecture in the Spanish territories held by the Spanish Crown between the 15th and 17th centuries. But by the mid-20th century this geographical connotation was questioned under the arguments of several authors, especially Camón Aznar (1945) and Rosenthal (1958), who defined Plateresque generically as a unitary amalgam of elements – Gothic, Muslim, and Renaissance. Aznar does not regard it as a style properly denoted as Renaissance, and Rosenthal emphasizes its association with certain buildings in other European countries, mainly France and Portugal, but also Germany and others.

This problem highlights the imprecision of the name Plateresque and the difficulties inherent in using it to describe productions from a period of confusion and transition between styles, especially since they are characterized by decorative profusion suggesting an attempt to disguise the failure of Spanish architects to develop new structural and spatial ideas. It has even been suggested that this problem could be solved by identifying what is called Plateresque as the replacement of Gothic decoration with grotesques inspired by the works of the Italian Sebastiano Serlio.

Any persuasive argument, however, must admit that the Plateresque or Protorenaissance was an artistic movement that responded to the demands of the ruling classes of imperial Spain, which had just completed the Reconquista and begun the colonization of the Americas. The Spanish were developing a consciousness of their growing power and wealth, and in their exuberance launched a period of construction of grand monuments to symbolize these with what are now considered national treasures.

== Features ==
=== Spanish Plateresque ===
Typical Plateresque façades, like those of altarpieces, were made as carefully as if they were the works of goldsmiths, and decorated as profusely. The decoration, although of various inspirations, was mainly of plant motifs, but also had a profusion of medallions, heraldic devices and animal figures, among others. Plateresque utilized a wealth of materials: gold plates on crests and roofs, vases, etc. There is evidence of more polychrome works at the conclusion of the first third of the 16th century, when there appeared heraldic crests of historical provenance and long balustrades, to mention one kind of less busy decoration.

The proliferation of decoration for all architectural surfaces led to the creation of new surfaces and subspaces, which were in turn decorated profusely, such as niches and aediculas.

Italian elements were also being developed progressively as decoration: rustications, classical capitals, Roman arches and especially grotesques.

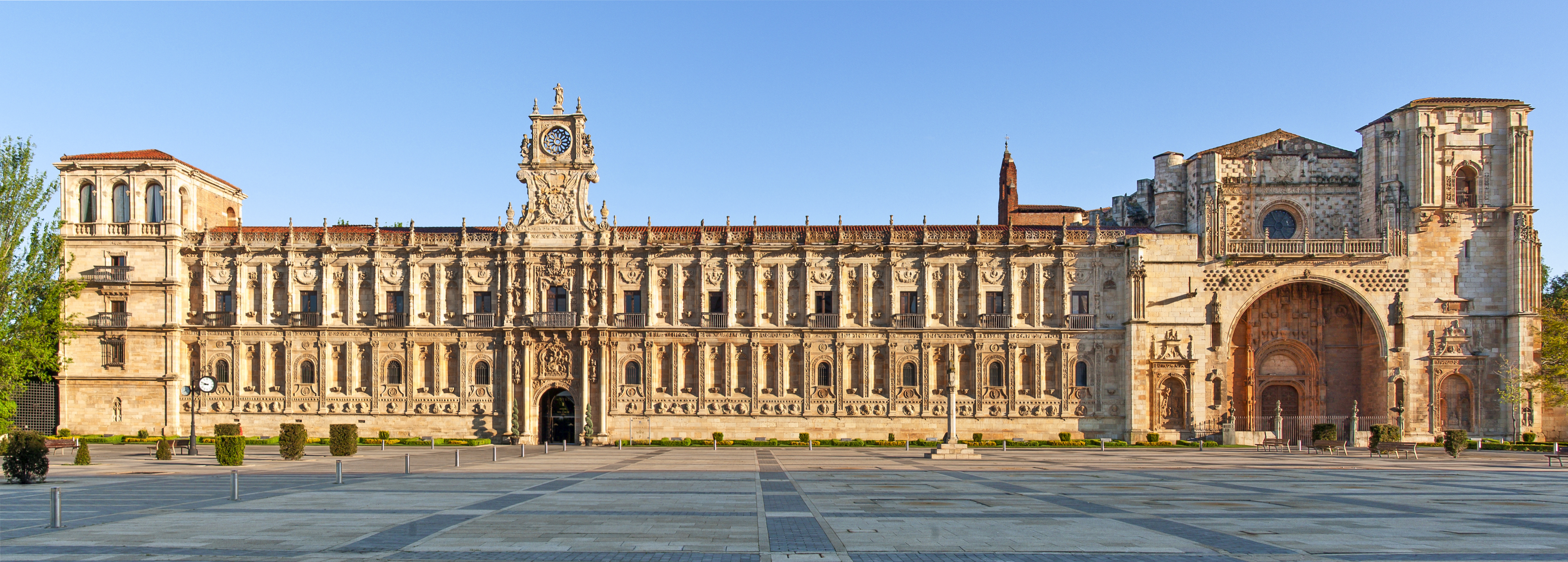
Plateresque Convento de San Marcos in León, Castile and León, Spain, built between 1537 and 1715.

The decoration had specific meanings and can not be read as merely decorative; thus laurels, military shields and horns-of-plenty were placed in the houses of military personnel. In a similar vein, Greek and Roman myths were depicted elsewhere to represent abstract humanist ideals, so that the decorative became a means to express and disseminate Renaissance ideals.

Plataresque implemented and preferred new spatial aspects, so caustrales, or stairs of open boxes, made their appearance. However, there were few spatial changes with respect to the Gothic tradition.

=== American Plateresque ===
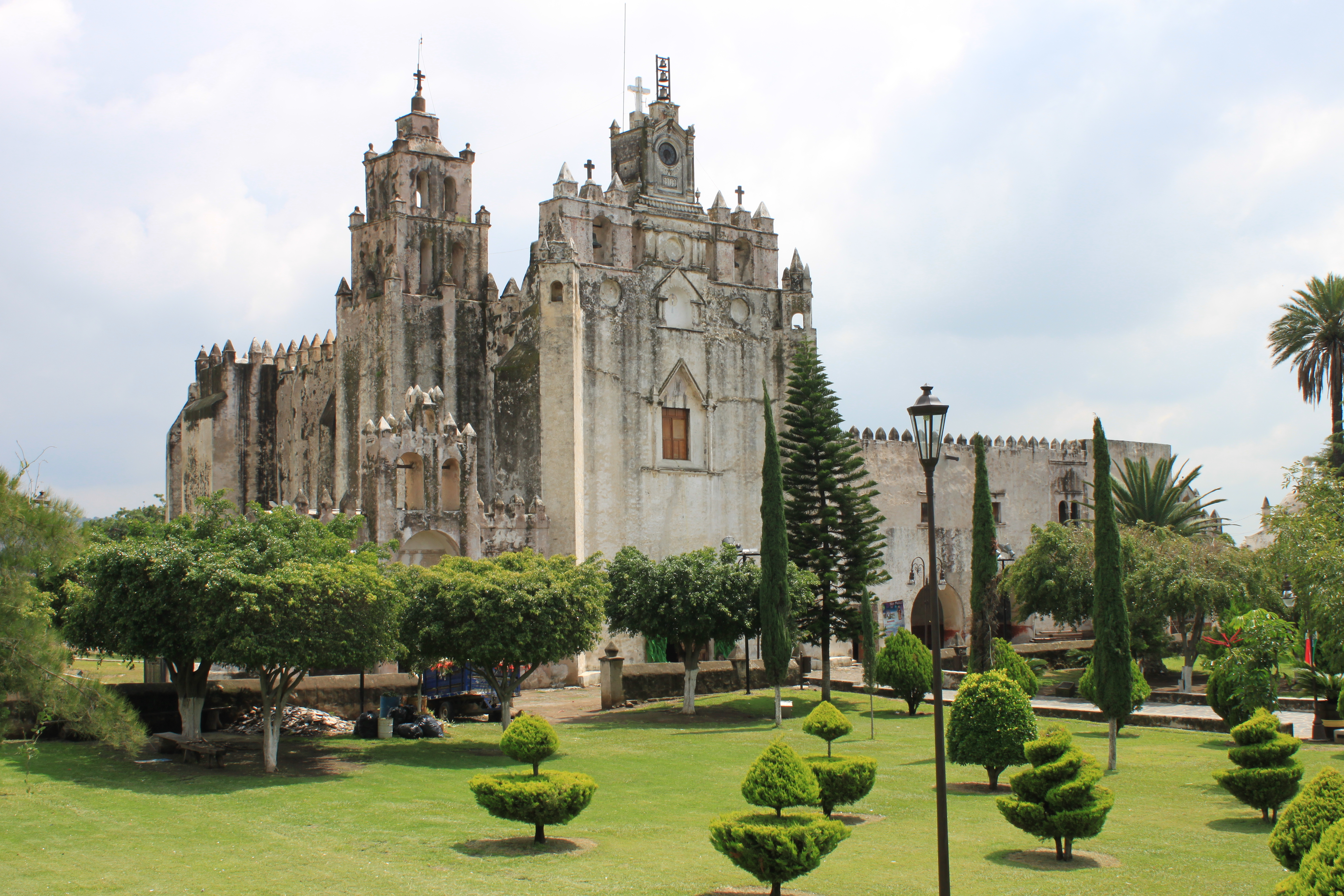
Convent of San Mateo Apóstol y Evangelista (1535-1567) in Atlatlahucan, Morelos, Mexico, is a Plateresque Gothic church that is a World Heritage Site by UNESCO

In the Americas, especially in today's Mexico, various indigenous cultures were in certain stages of development that can be considered Baroque when the Spanish brought with them the Plateresque style. This European phenomenon mixed symbiotically with local traditions, so that pure Gothic architecture was not built in the Americas, but the Plateresque mixed with Native American influences, soon evolving into what came to be called American Baroque.

== History ==
The Plateresque style follows the line of Isabelline, where decorative elements of Italianate origin combine with Iberian traditional elements to form ornamental complexes that overlay the Gothic structures. We can speak of Plateresque that retains Gothic forms as a basis until 1530. After that date, although it continued to be used and Plateresque ornaments were still evolving, it became part of an architecture that was beginning to incorporate Renaissance ideas. In 1563, with the start of construction of the monastery of San Lorenzo de El Escorial, the Renaissance architecture was purified through the interventions of Juan de Herrera, which ended the splendor and spread of the Plateresque in the Iberian Peninsula. But in Mexico it was not forgotten, leading to a Neo-Plateresque style in the 18th century.

In any case the Plateresque, considered or not as a style, and whether exclusively Spanish or more broadly European, represents the transition between Gothic and Renaissance styles.

=== Isabelline Style (15th century) ===
In the 15th century a tendency to decorate with flamboyance began to develop in the Crown of Castile from Flemish, Islamic and Castilian architecture, which received the name of Isabelline Gothic because most of the construction was done at the command of Isabella I of Castile. These ornaments, which were of progressive complexity, did not influence the internal structure of the buildings.

Something similar happened in the same period in Portugal, resulting in what became known as the Manueline style.

=== Plateresque Gothic (late 15th century–1530) ===
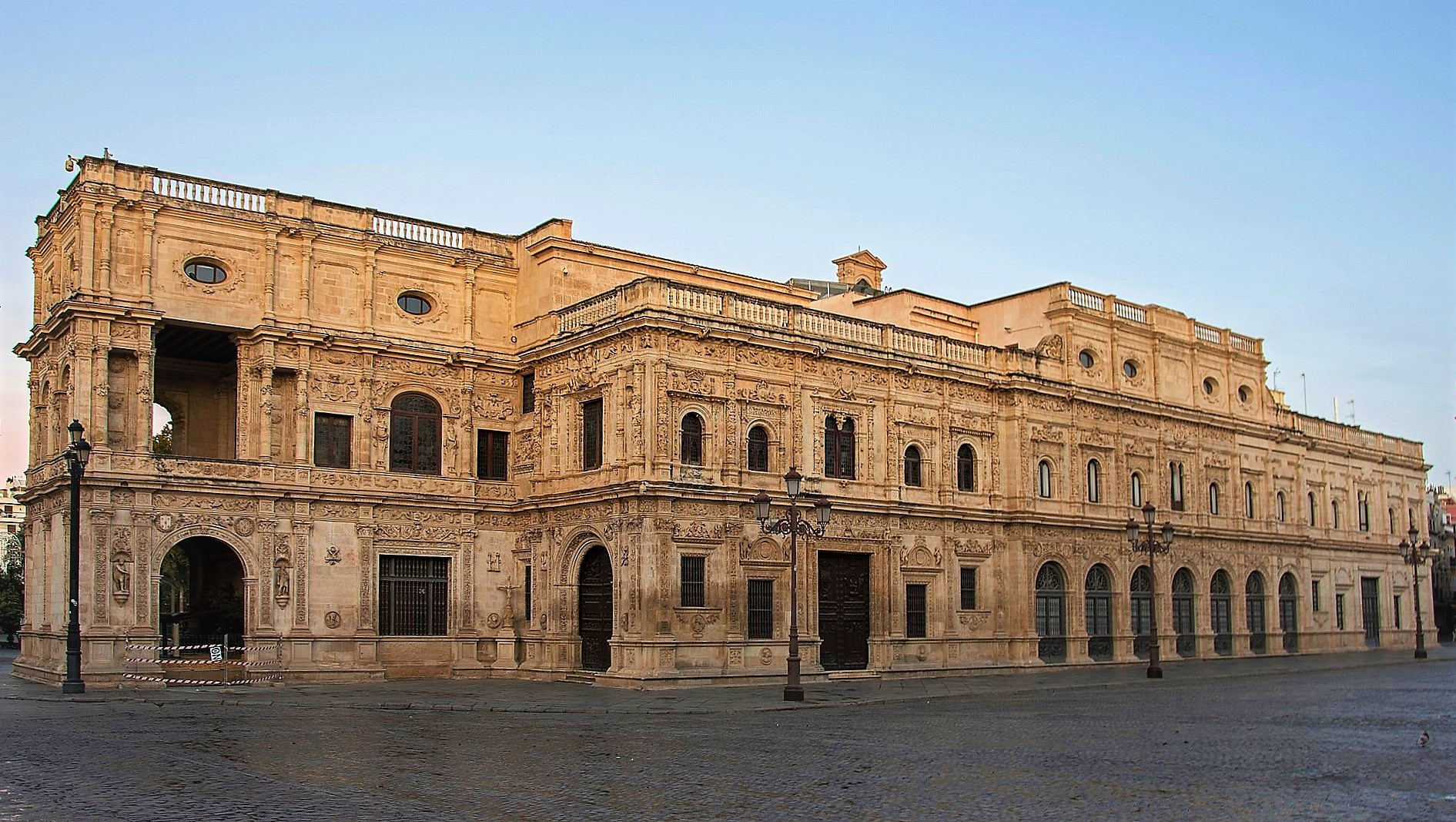
Façade of the City Hall of Seville built in the 15th century, it is one of the first Plateresque-style buildings made in Spain. In Seville, Andalusia, Spain

A movement began in late 15th century Spain to disguise Gothic buildings with florid decoration, especially grotesques, but the superficial application of this principle did not change the spatial qualities or architectural structure of those buildings. This process began when the Renaissance arrived in Spain and architects began copying Renaissance architectural features without understanding the new ideas behind them, that is, without letting go of medieval forms and ideas.

Many of the Plateresque buildings were already built, to which were added only layers of Renaissance ornamentation, especially around openings (windows and doors), and in general, all non-architectural elements, with some exceptions.

Although the appellation 'Plateresque' is usually applied to the act of superimposing new Renaissance elements on forms governed by medieval guidelines in architecture, this trend is also seen in the Spanish painting and sculpture of the time.

=== Plateresque Renaissance (1530–1560) ===
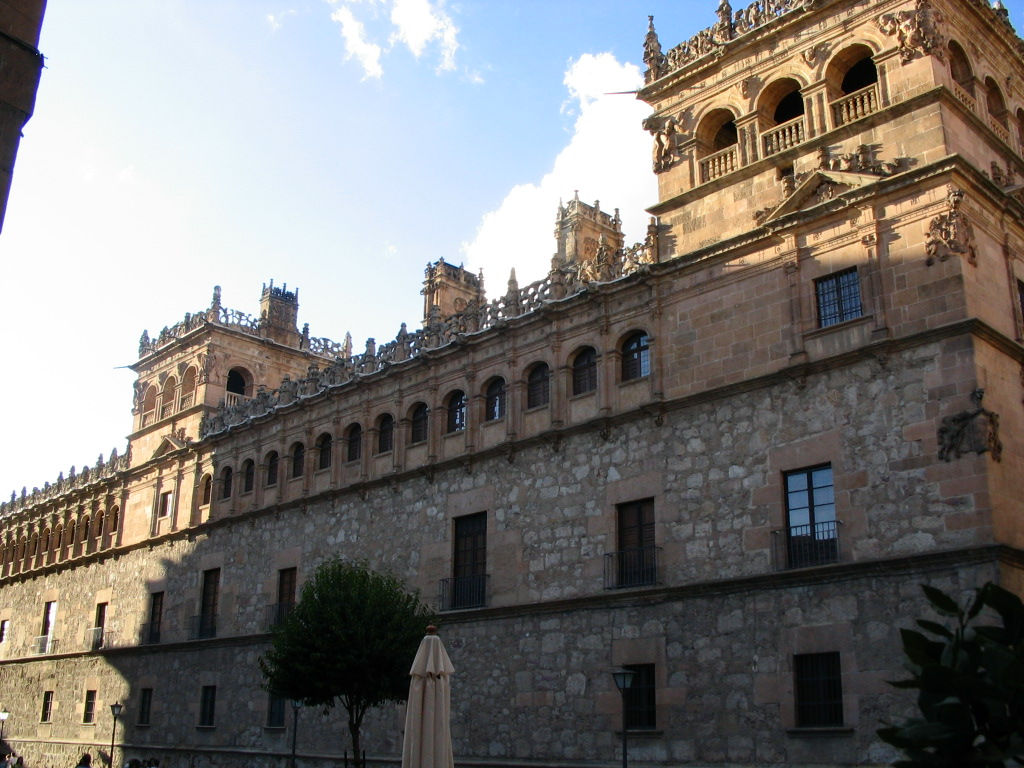
Palacio de Monterrey (1539–1559), Salamanca, Castile and León, Spain, it was a building much admired and imitated in the nineteenth century in Spain, giving rise to the so-called Monterrey or Neoplateresque style.

This is the period in which the Renaissance had taken hold on the Iberian Peninsula, although it had not yet reached its peak there. That event occurred with the amendments by Juan de Herrera and Philip II of Spain to the design of the monastery of El Escorial, whose construction began in 1563.

By that time the decoration, though still profuse, is completely within Italianate parameters and applied to buildings designed according to the logic of Renaissance ideas.

=== Revival in Spain: 19th & 20th-century Monterrey Style or Neo-plateresque ===
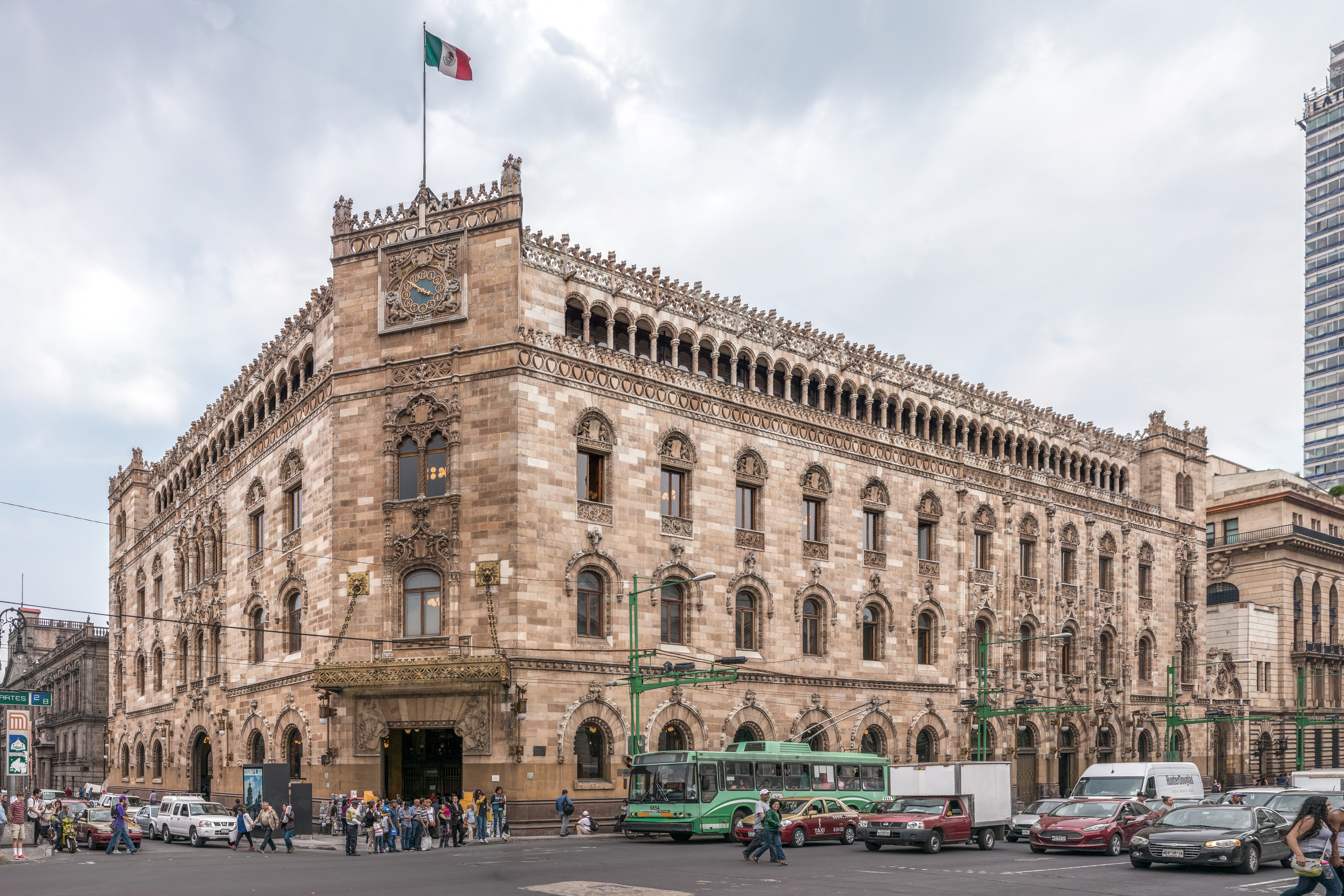
The Palacio de Correos (b. 1902–1907) in Mexico City, Mexico, is an important example of Neoplateresque in the Americas.

The Monterrey o neo-plateresque style arose in the 19th century. It was named after the Palacio de Monterrey in Salamanca, a plateresque building built in 1539. Widely admired among 19th-century architects, it was profusely imitated across Spain, with the new imitations spawning a new historicist style, the neoplateresque.

The style survived until the early 20th century, featured in national and regional 'revivals'. It spread widely, and though not accepted in the critical circles of academia, some examples can be found on the Gran Vía of Madrid.

In Mexico there was also a new iteration of Plateresque which spread to the Southwestern United States, beginning in the first half of the 18th century. This Neo-plateresque is not to be confused with that of Spain at the end of 19th and early 20th centuries, the so-called Monterrey style.

== Examples ==
=== Plateresque architects and artists ===
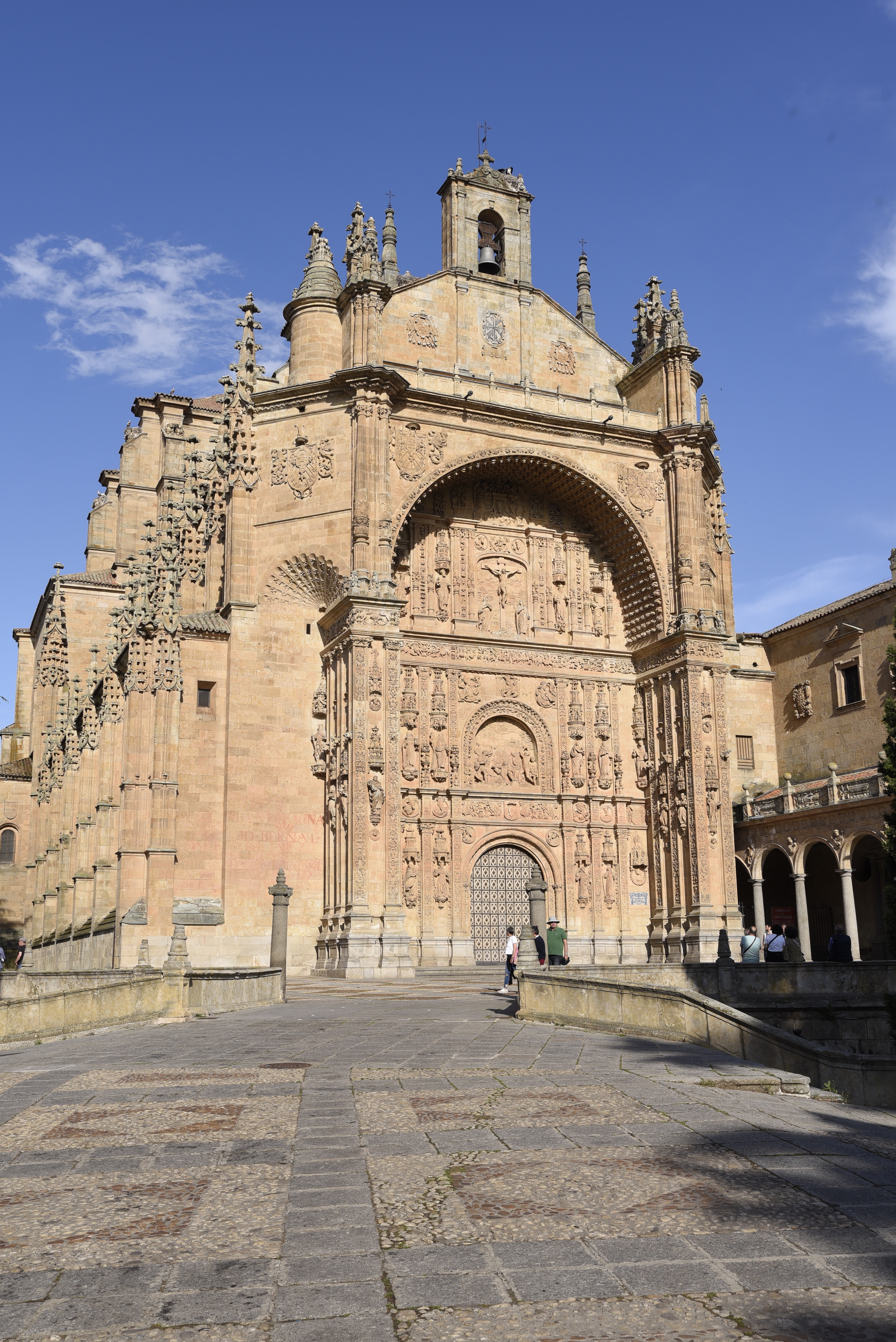
Plateresque Convento de San Esteban (1524-1610) in Salamanca, Castile and León, Spain

- Of First Plateresque.
  - Diego de Alcázar
  - Alonso de Covarrubias
  - Martín de Gainza
  - Rodrigo Gil de Hontañón
  - Gil de Siloé
  - Andrés de Vandelvira
  - Diego de Riaño
  - Diego Siloe
  - Vasco de la Zarza
- Of Neo-Plateresque.
  - Eduardo Adaro Magro
  - José López Sallaberry

=== Plateresque buildings, architectural elements, and other works ===
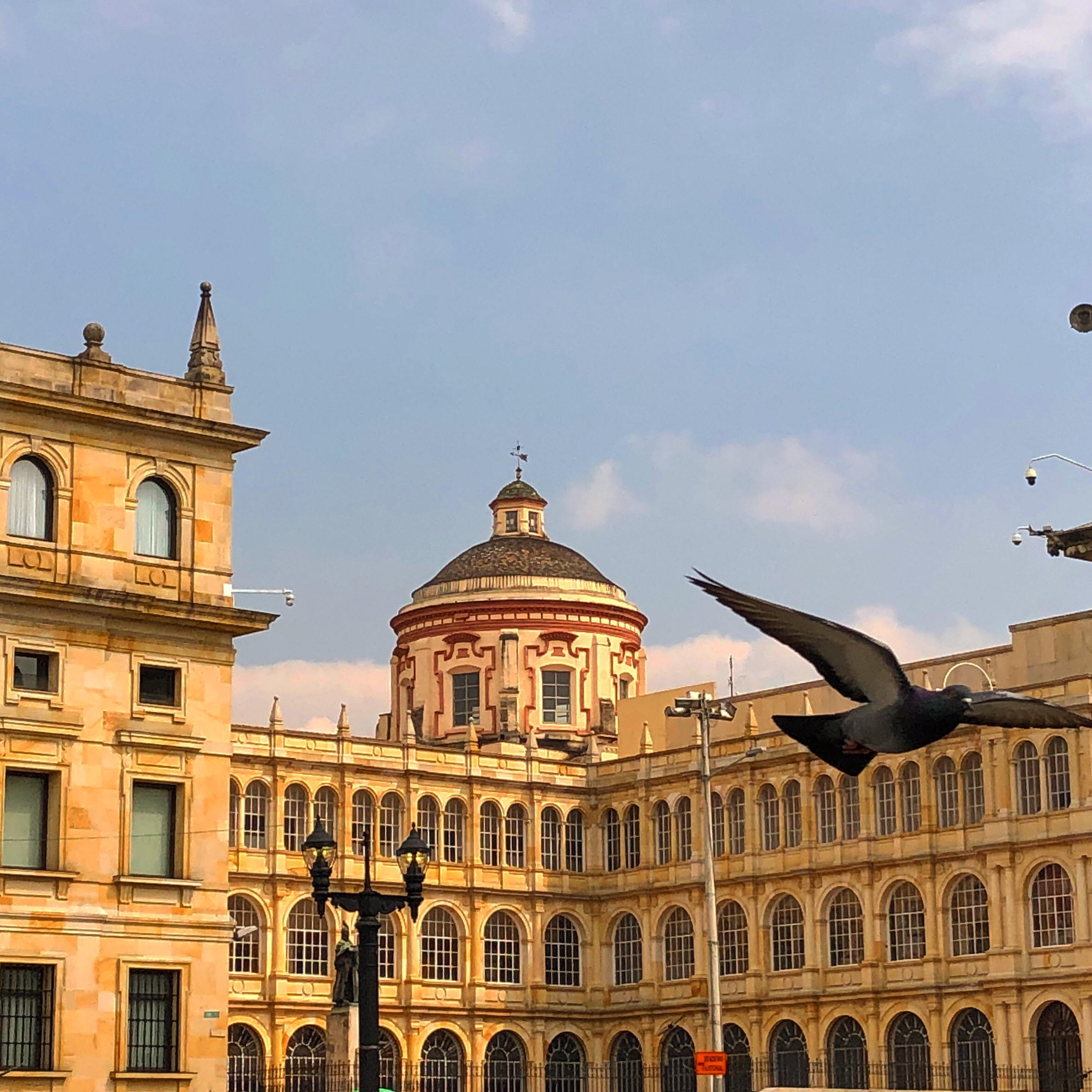
The Colonial Plateresque style Colegio Mayor de San Bartolomé, built between 1604-1622, in Bogotá, Colombia.

- The façade of Convent of San Marcos (León).
- The Tower of Guadramiro (Salamanca).
- The castle of the Maqueda street.
- The façade of the University of Salamanca.
- The façade of the Basilica of Saint Mary Major of Pontevedra.
- The Hospital of the Catholic Monarchs of Santiago de Compostela.
- The façade of the New Cathedral of Salamanca.
- The façade of the Convent of San Esteban of Salamanca.
- The cloister of the Convent of las Dueñas of Salamanca.
- The façade of the Church of Sancti Spiritus of Salamanca.
- The Palace of Monterrey in Salamanca.
- The façade of the Colegio Mayor de San Ildefonso, of the University of Alcalá de Henares.
- The Casa de las Conchas of Salamanca.
- The Convent of San Marcos of León.
- The City Council of Seville.
- The façade of Forgiveness and the balcony of the relics of the Cathedral of Coria.
- The Gate of la Pellejería of the Cathedral of Burgos.
- The Hospital del Rey of Burgos.
- The antecrypt and retrochoir of the Cathedral of Palencia.
- The University of Oñati, Basque Country, Spain.
- The Porta Maior of Viveiro.
- The ironworks of the Casa de Pilatos Seville.
- The façade of the Church of Santo Tomás in Haro.
- The pulpit of the Church of San Andrés Apóstol of Villanueva de los Infantes.
- The Main Entrance of the Cathedral of Santa María la Menor of Santo Domingo, Dominican Republic.
- Casa de los Cinco Medallones in Santo Domingo, Dominican Republic, it was built in 1540.
- The House of the Sun of the Hearst Castle of San Simeon, California, USA, based in the Spanish plateresque architecture.
- The Administration Building at Texas Tech University which was directly inspired by University of Alcalá.
- The Velarde Palace in Santillana del Mar.
- Rosary Cathedral in Toledo, Ohio.
- The cloister of the Real Monasterio De San Zoilo, Carrión de los Condes, Palencia
- The Palace of the Conquest in Trujillo, Spain
- Colegio Mayor de San Bartolomé, built between 1604-1622, in Bogotá, Colombia.

== Plateresque Revival ==
In the Spanish Colonial Revival architecture style centuries later, it was differentiated from the earlier and plainer Mission Revival style with the additional refinement of Plateresque and Churrigueresque detailing. Bertram Goodhue and Carleton Winslow Sr. studied Spanish Colonial structures in Mexico before designing the 1915 Panama–California Exposition in San Diego, California, that introduced this style to the United States and subsequent widespread popularity. In Mexico there are other examples, such as the Palacio de Correos de Mexico. In Cuba there is the Havana Central railway station, and in Guatemala there is the National Palace of Culture.

== See also ==
- Churrigueresque
