= Palacio de Correos de México =

Historic building in Mexico City

Palacio de Correos
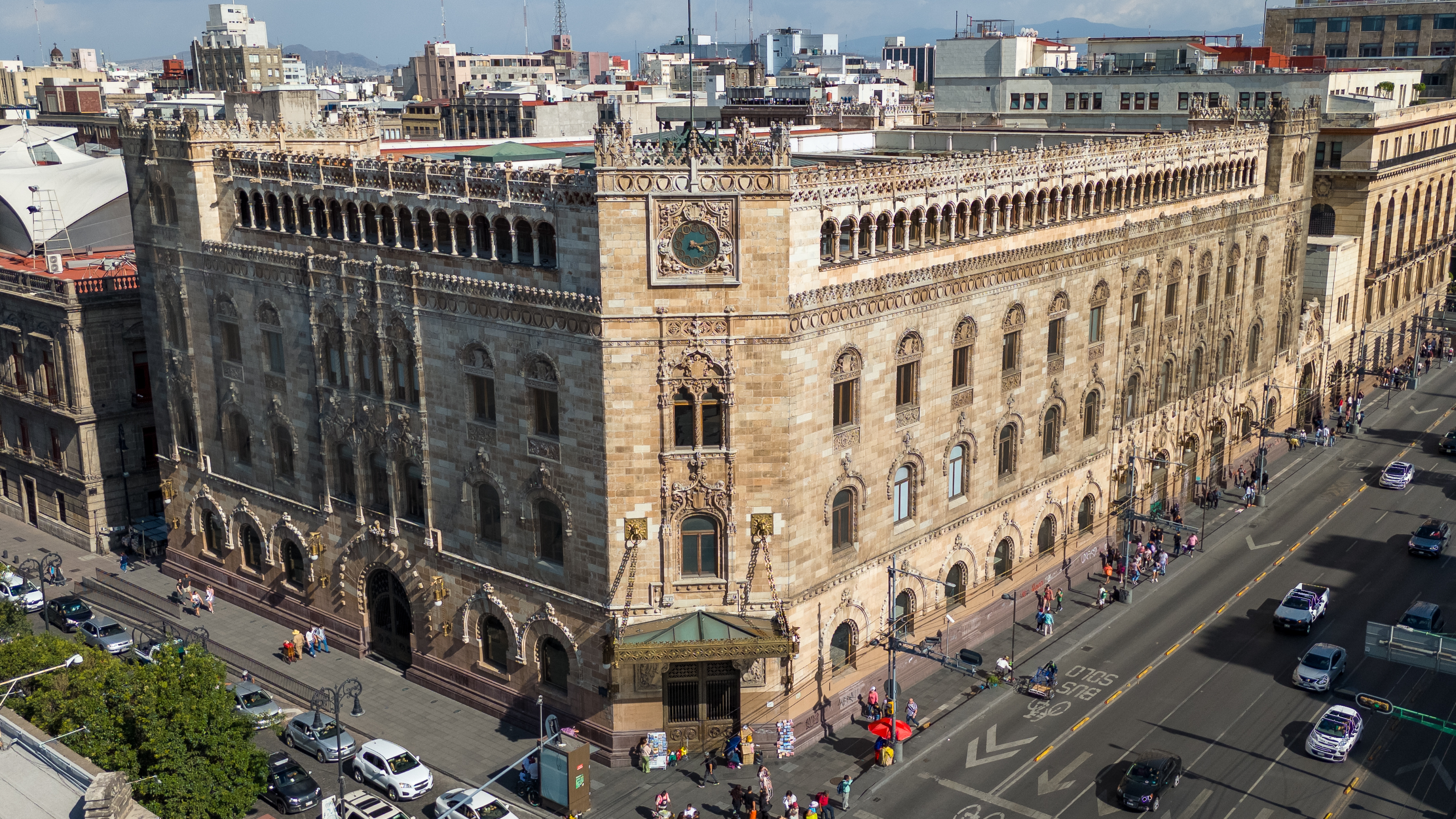
- View of the Palacio de Correos in Mexico City from the NW

General information
- Architectural style: Plateresque Revival
- Location: center of Mexico City, on the Eje Central (Lazaro Cardenas) near the Palacio de Bellas Artes
- Coordinates: 19.435686°N 99.1404°W
- Construction started: 1902
- Completed: 1907

Design and construction
- Architect: Adamo Boari

The Palacio de Correos de México (Postal Palace of Mexico City), also known as the "Correo Mayor" (Main Post Office) is located in the historic center of Mexico City, on the Eje Central (Lázaro Cardenas) near the Palacio de Bellas Artes. It was built in 1907, when the Post Office became a separate government entity. Its design and construction was the most modern at the time, including a very eclectic style which mixed several different traditions, mainly Neo-Plateresque, into a very complex design. In the 1950s, the building was modified in a way that caused stress and damage, so when the 1985 earthquake struck Mexico City, it was heavily damaged. In the 1990s, restoration work has brought the building back to original construction and appearance.

== History ==
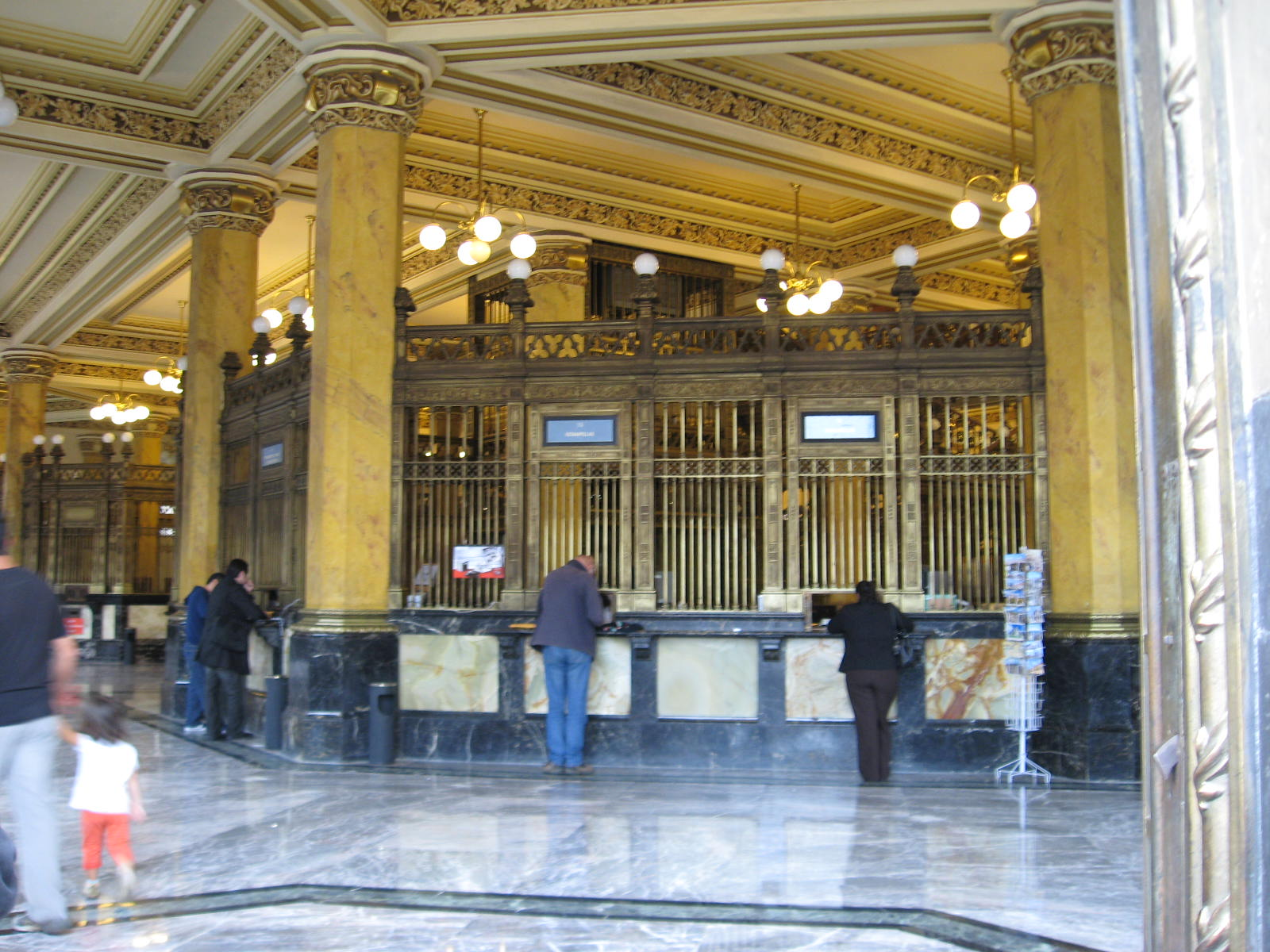
Two service windows upon entering the Palacio de Correos from the main entrance.

In 1901, the Dirección General de Correos (General Direction of Mail) was made a separate government agency. Before, it has been an administrative division of the Ministry of Communications and Transportation. It was then decided that this function should have its own building, in part due to the volume of mail being handled annually at that time, which was about 130 million pieces. The Italian architect Adamo Boari was chosen for the project. The design is eclectic, yet Boari's design pulls the various styles used together. The military engineer Gonzalo Garita y Frontera supervised the construction. The site chosen was the old Hospital of Terceros Franciscanos, which was demolished in 1902. The foundation laid was a new technique called "Chicago" consisting of a concrete slab with a thickness of 70 cm reinforced with steel beams. This foundation was mostly constructed in New York, by the Milliken Brothers and shipped to Mexico in 1903. The first stone of the building was placed on 14 September 1902, and work on the building lasted for another five years. In 1907, the building was inaugurated by then president of Mexico, Porfirio Diaz, who, in a symbolic act, dropped two postcards into the receiving bin, one addressed to a location in Mexico City, and one addressed to a different locale in the country. For some time after it was built, this palace was also called the Quinta Casa de Correos (Fifth House of Mail), since it was the fifth building to house postal services in Mexico City.

The building has remained in continuous operation as a post office since 1907. However, in the 1950s, the growing economy forced the Bank of Mexico next door to occupy a large section of the Palacio de Correos, for this reason, two bridges were built to connect the Palacio with the Bank of Mexico building. Modifications for the Bank destroyed much of the decoration elements that were originally in this section. They also added greatly to the weight of the building and have overloaded the steel structure. This would cause damage to the building, along with the 1985 Mexico City earthquake.

== Description ==
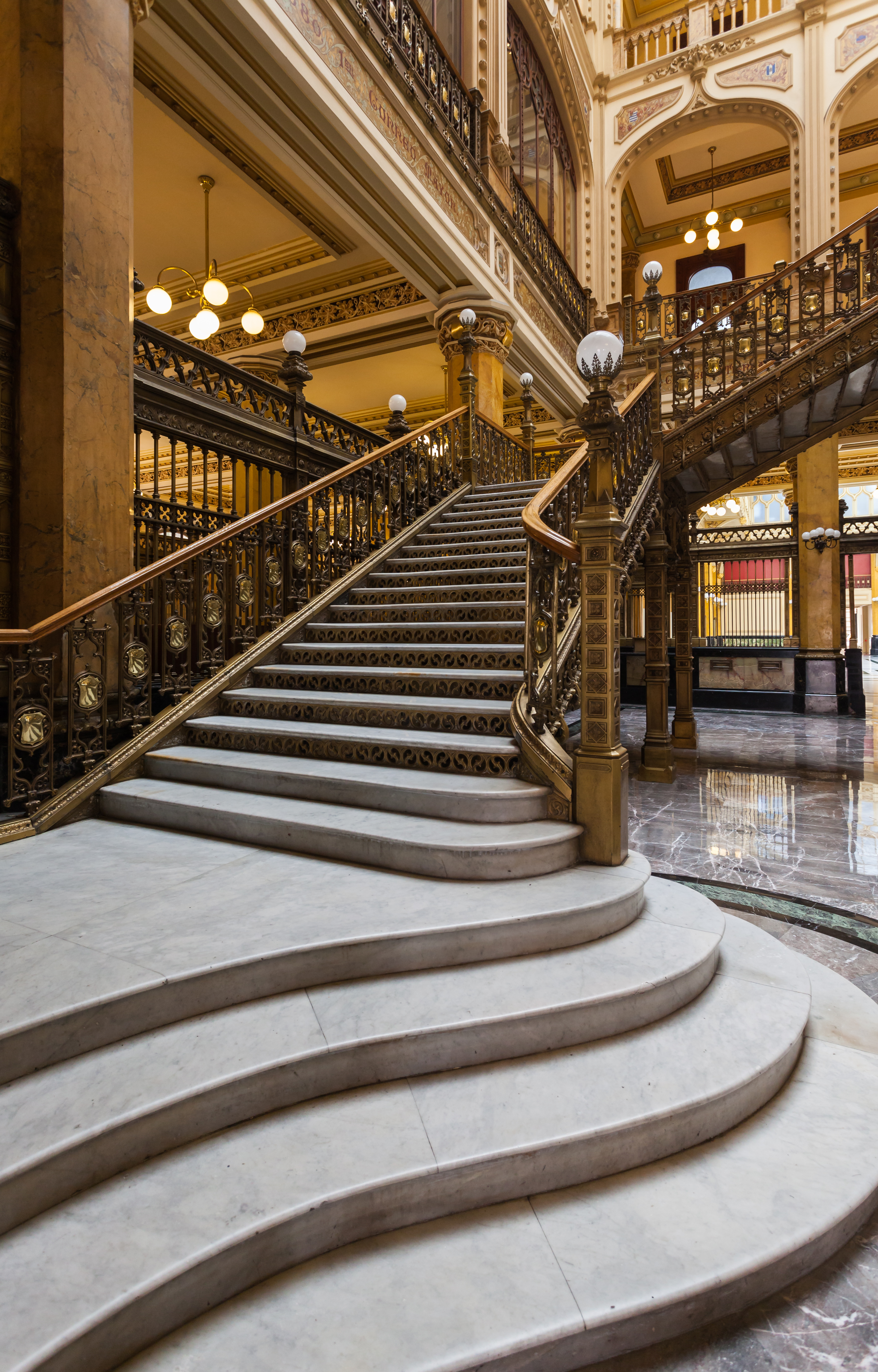
Lateral stairs.

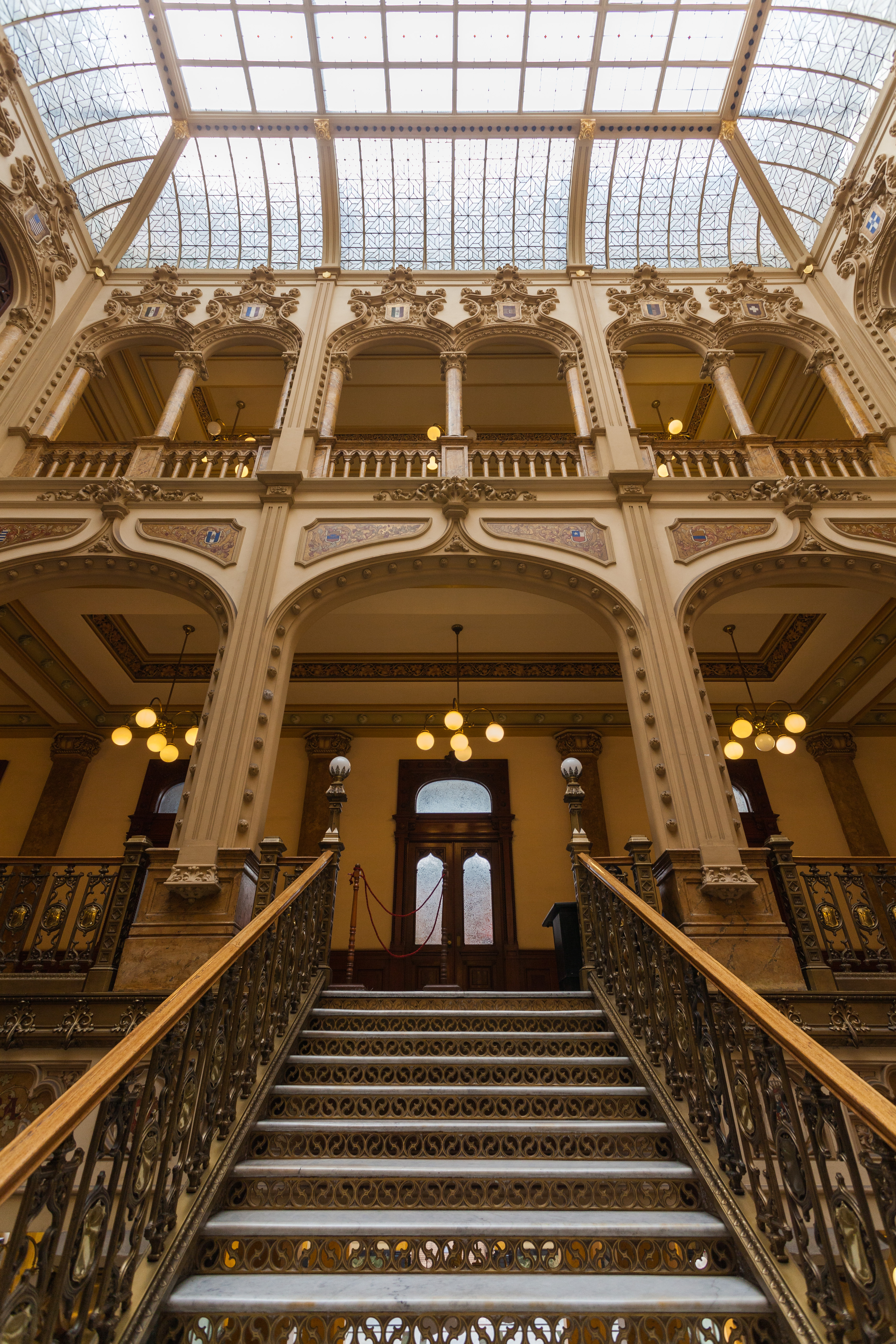
Frontal view of the central stairs.

Its highly eclectic architectural style includes Art Nouveau, Spanish Renaissance Revival, Plateresque, Spanish Rococo, Elizabethan Gothic, Elizabethan Plateresque, Venetian Gothic Revival, Moorish, Neoclassical, Baroque, and Art Deco. There is also a mix of materials and design elements from Europe and Mexico. The palace contains ornaments of marble, plaster of paris and white "cantera" stone from Puebla.

The building has a steel frame and a foundation built on an enormous grid of steel beams, which has allowed it to withstand a number of earthquakes and has avoided the subsidence problem that plagues many buildings here.

The post office is made with a very light-colored, almost translucent variety of a stone called "chiluca." The exterior is covered in decorative details such as iron dragon light fixtures and intricately carved stone around the windows and the edge of the roof. Much of the metal work around the windows and other parts of the facade highly polished brass, which was made in Italy. An example of the building's complicated design is that each of the floors has windows of a different architectural style. The facade's unity is kept through the repetition of arches. The main entrance has a large ironwork canopy which is typical of the Art Nouveau that was fashionable in the early 20th century. The gallery on the fourth floor consists of slender Solomonic columns and a filigree cresting that surrounds the entire building.

Inside, the marble floors and shelves combine with bronze and iron window frames manufactured in Florence, Italy. The main stairway is characterized by two separate ramps that come together to form a landing. They also seem to cross on the second landing above, after which each move off in their own direction. The meeting room contains frescos by Bartolomé Gallotti painted over a base of 24 carat gold, with themes relating to the history of written communication and the sending of messages.

== Restoration ==
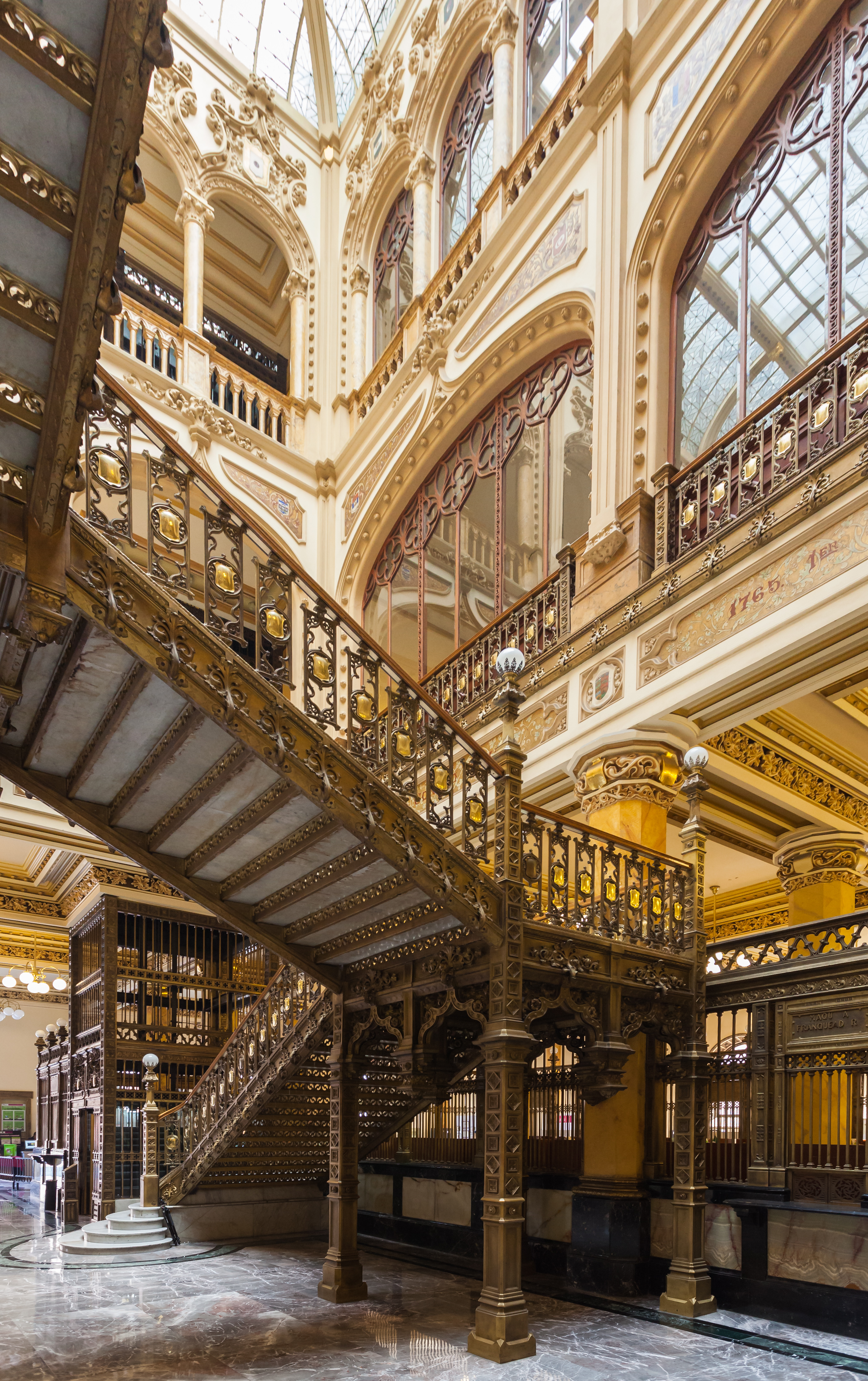
Stairs.

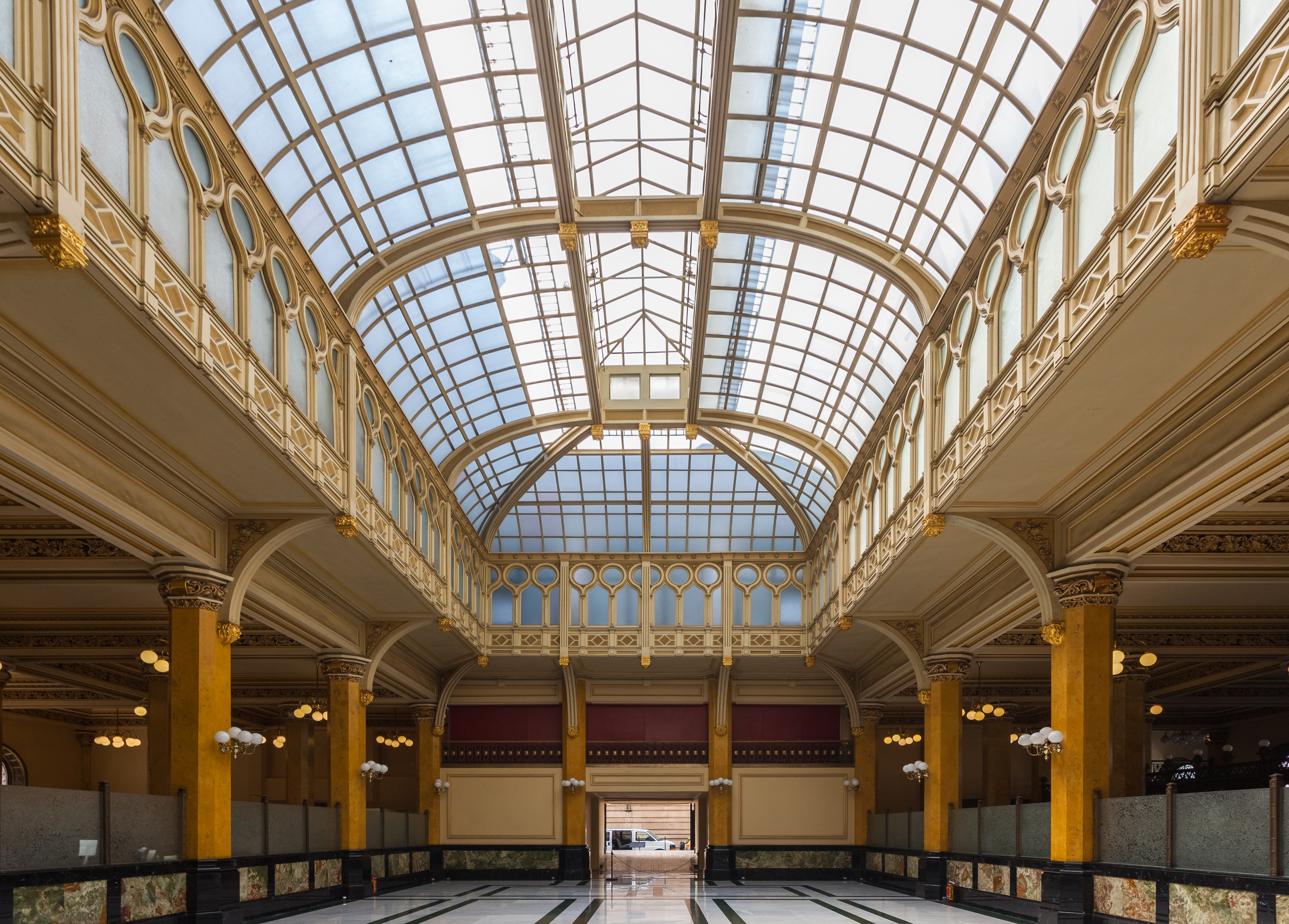
Postal Palace.

From the 1950s to the 1980s, the Bank of Mexico located next door on Madero Street, occupied a large section of the Palacio. The Bank made extensive modifications to its portion of the building, such as security walls, roofing the open-air terraces and the like that added a great deal of weight and stress to the steel-beam building. This in and of itself caused damage to the building, but when the 1985 earthquake struck Mexico City, this damage was made far worse. The earthquake also severely damaged or destroy a number of buildings nearby, so when city reconstruction efforts began, the Bank decided to move out of the Palacio and build new structures nearby to house their extra offices. The building was declared an Artistic Monument on 4 May 1987, due to its beauty and history, and restoration efforts were begun in the 1990s. These efforts were significantly helped by the large number of graphic representations of the structure as it originally appeared and other documents kept by the National Archives. They were also able to locate the architect's daughter in Italy, who donated her father's plans and notes from the project. These can now be seen at the National Museum of Architecture, in the Palacio de Bellas Artes.

Restoration began with the structure of the building, repairing and reinforcing the columns and steel beams damaged by the earthquake. Next came the removal of the weight added to the building by the projects done by the Bank of Mexico, restoring the floors to their original weight and construction design. Last done, was the reconstruction of the interiors that had been greatly modified and with most of the original decorative elements destroyed. For this aspect of the work, Boari's plans and notes proved invaluable. The restoration project also allowed for the technological upgrading of services.

== Naval History Museum ==
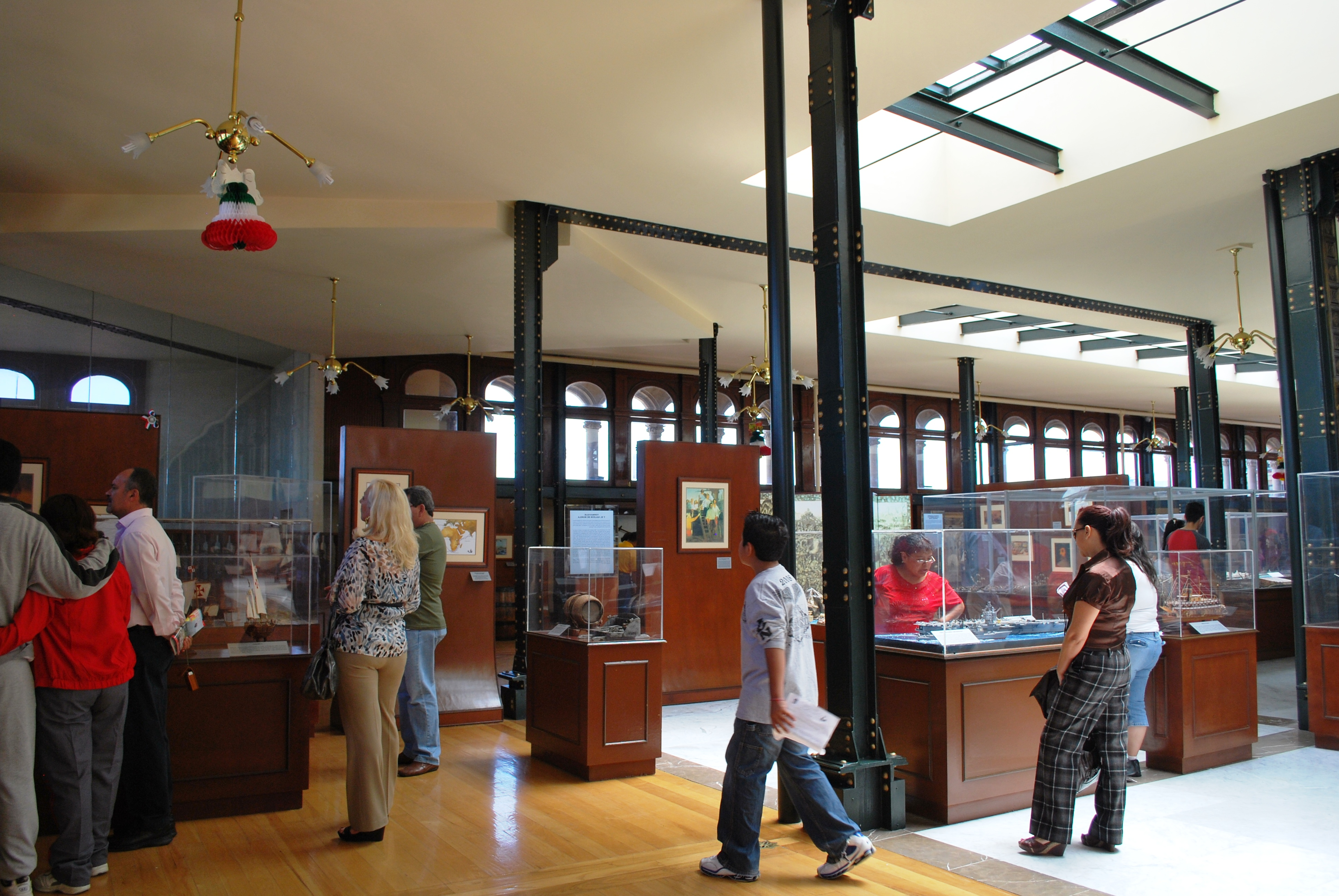
View of the floor of the Naval History Museum in Mexico City.

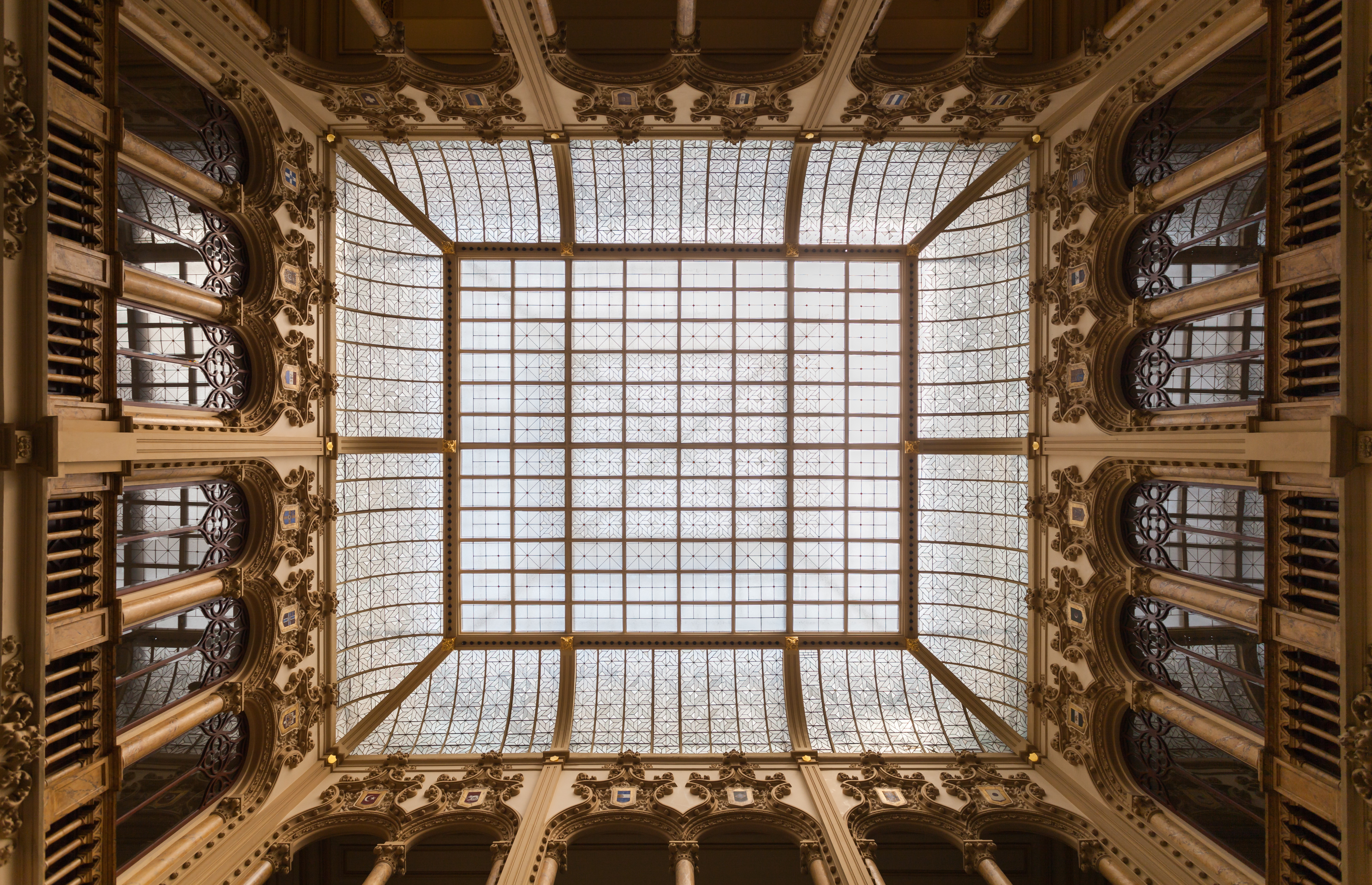
Dome of the stairs hall.

The Naval Historical Museum was located until 2013 on the fourth floor of the Palace, occupying a space of 1,346 m2. The collection included models, photographs, maps and other items from the different eras of navigation in Mexico. The museum is divided into six areas, labeled A through F each relating to a particular era or aspect of Mexico maritime history. Section A is dedicated to the origins of navigation both in the Old and New Worlds up to the first maps of the New World. Section B deals with maritime events of New Spain. Section C deals with the time period after Mexico gained her Independence in 1821 until the beginning of the 20th century. Section D covers the Mexican Revolution from 1910 to 1920, including the battle between the "Tampico" and the "Guerrero" as well as the United States occupation of Veracruz. Section E is entitled "Modern Mexico" and covers the decades between 1920 and 1970, which includes Mexico's part in World War II. The last section, F, is titled "Contemporary Mexico" from 1970 to 2004, which focuses on the Mexican Navy's latest acquisitions as well as future projects.

Paintings are mostly portraits such as those of Pedro Sainz de Baranda y Borreyro, Blas Godínez Brito, José Sebastián Holzinger, Lieutenant José Azueta Abad, Cadete Virgilio and Uribe Roble and of historical events such as the defense of the Fort of San Juan de Ulúa during the failed French Intervention in Mexico, the bombing of the Port of Veracruz in 1846, the lake battle of the Spanish Conquest of Tenochtitlan, the naval battle between the "Tampico" and the "Guerrero", and the sinking of the "Potrero del Llano."
