= Convento de las Dueñas =

Convent in Salamanca, Spain

Coordinates: 40°57′40″N 5°39′48.78″W

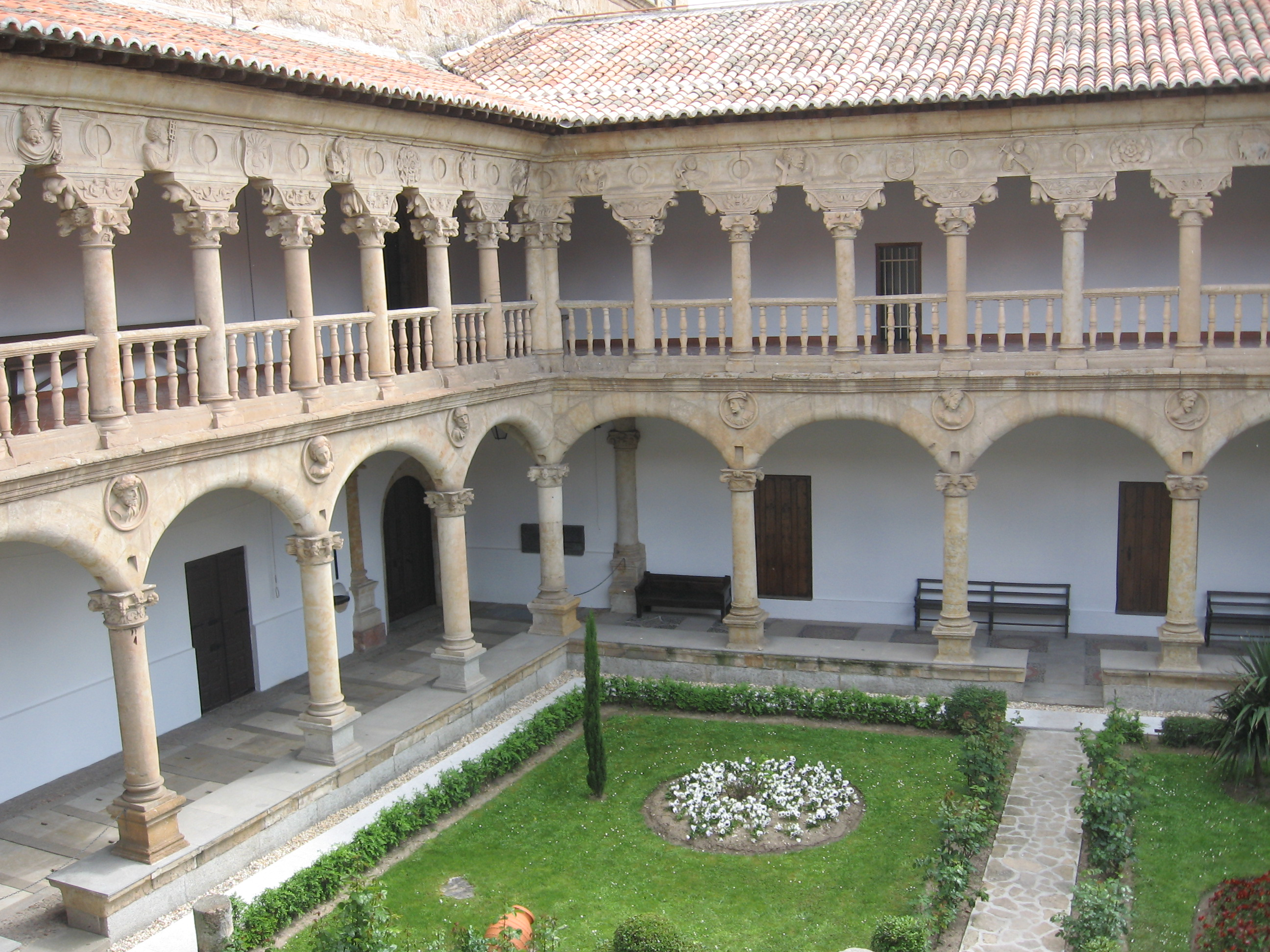
Cloister

The Convento de las Dueñas is a Dominican convent located in the city of Salamanca. It was built in the 15th and 16th centuries.

== History ==
The convent was founded in 1419 by Juana Rodriguez de Monroy in the palace that was property of her husband, Juan Sánchez de Sevilla, a prominent converso. The church and the cloister were built around 1533.

== Architecture ==
The convent preserves some of the original mudejar gates of the palace. One of them leads to the cloister. The capitals of the upper storey are among the more prominent examples of the Plateresque.

== Sources ==
- Rodriguez G. de Ceballos, Alfonso (2005). Guía artística de Salamanca. León: Ediciones Lancia. ISBN 84-8177-103-1.
