= Casa de las Conchas =

Historical building in Salamanca, Spain

Coordinates: 40.962931°N 5.665814°W

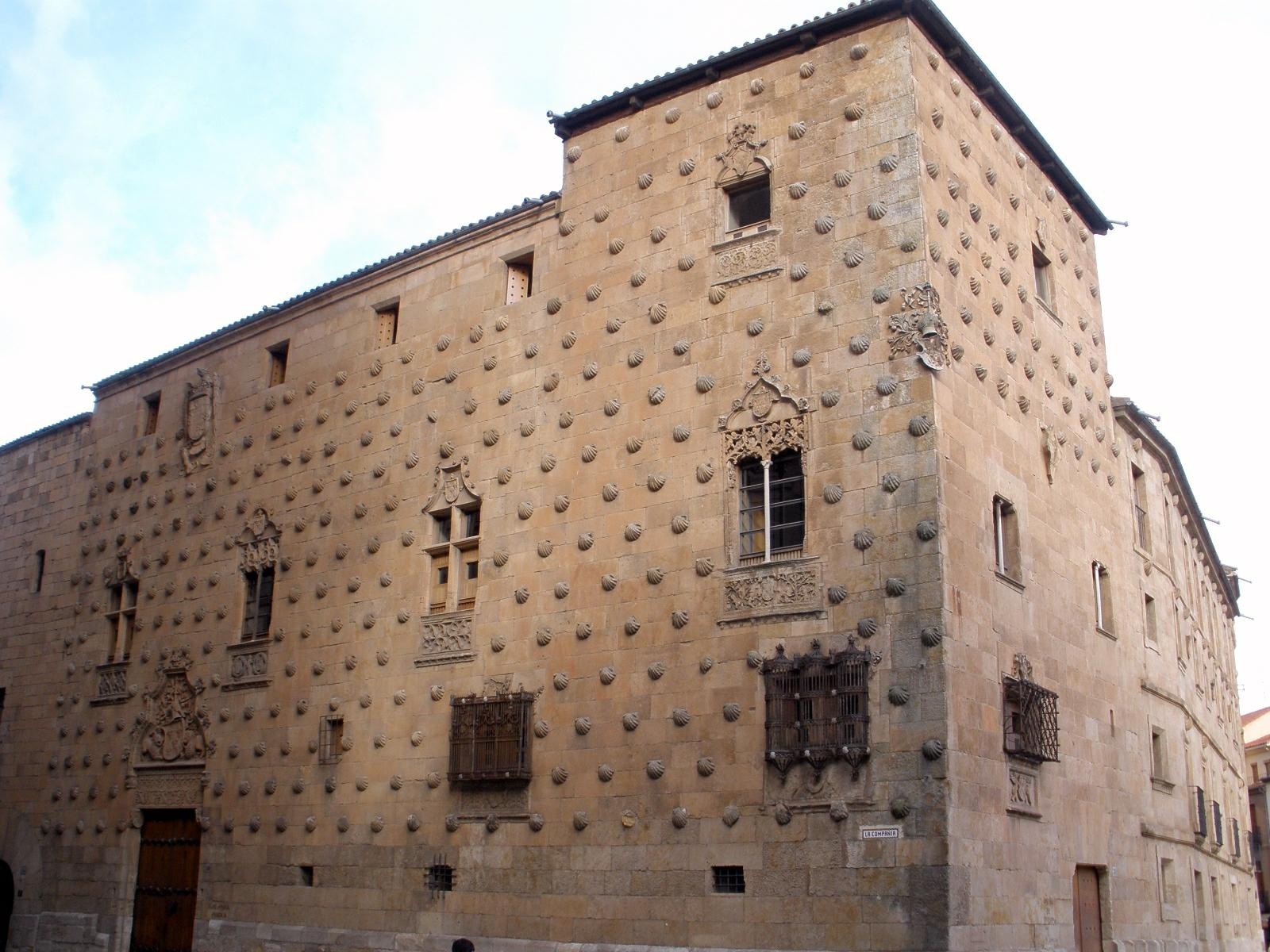
Façade of Casa de las Conchas

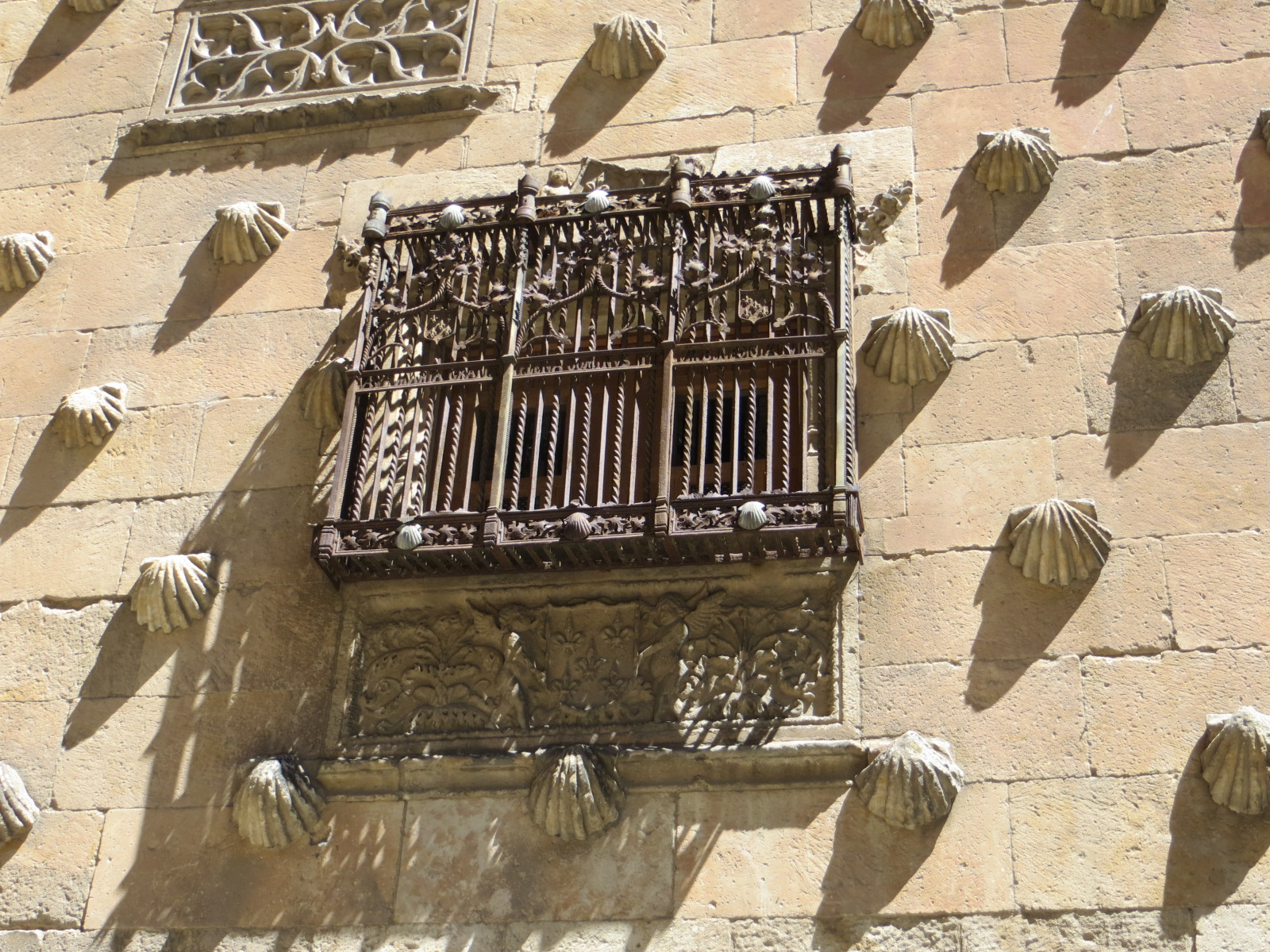
Window in the facade

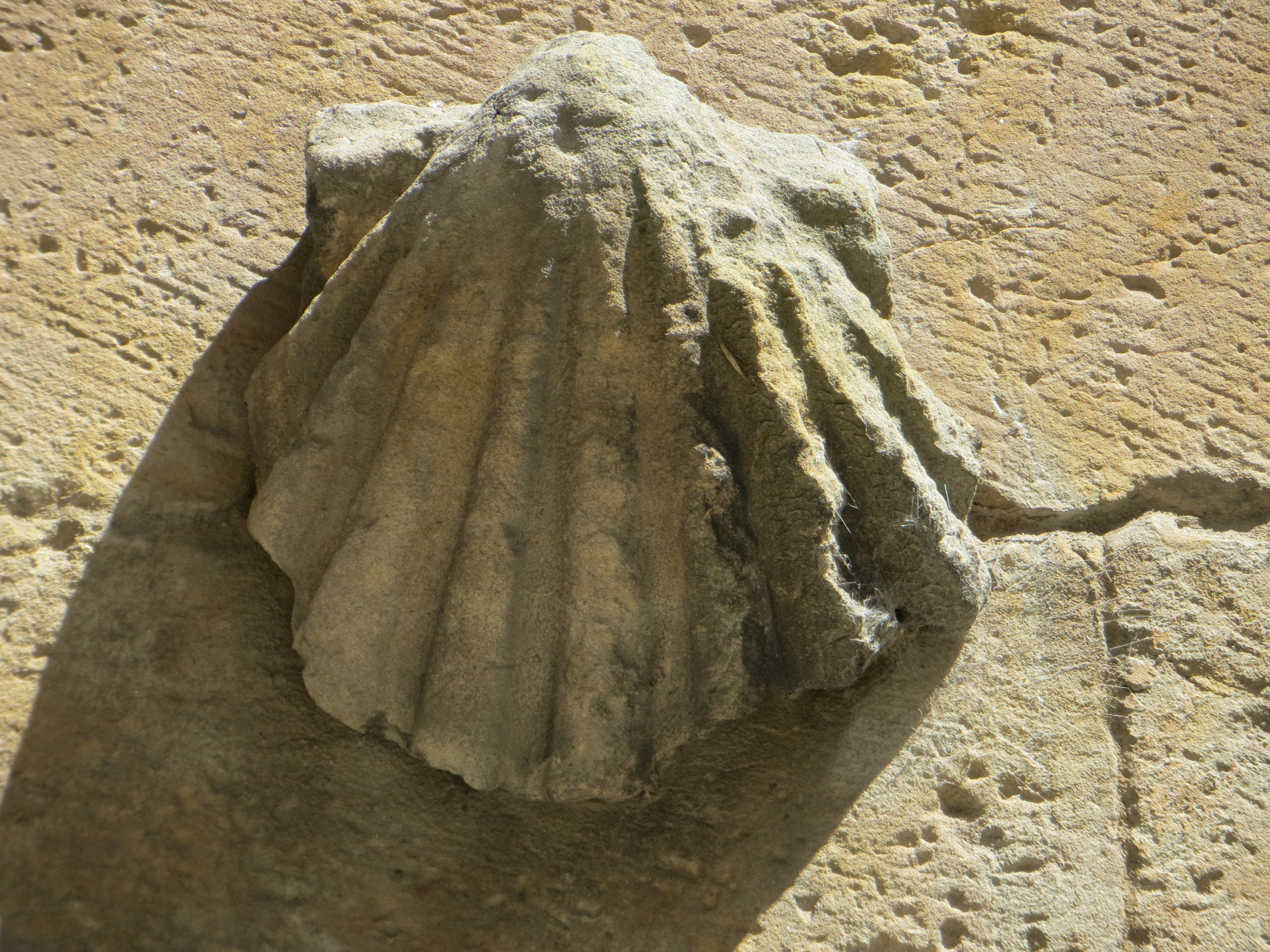
Detail on the facade

The Casa de las Conchas is a historical building in Salamanca, central Spain. It currently houses a public library.

It was built from 1493 to 1517 by Rodrigo Arias de Maldonado, a knight of the Order of Santiago de Compostela and a professor in the University of Salamanca. Its most peculiar feature is the façade, mixing late Gothic and Plateresque with more than 300 shells, symbol of the order of Santiago, as well as of the pilgrims performing the Way of St. James. In the façade are also the coat of arms of the Catholic Monarchs and four windows in Gothic style, each one having a different shape. The entrance portal has the coat of arms of the Maldonado family, while in the dolphins, a Renaissance symbol of love, and vegetable elements.

The inner court is characterized, in the lower floor, by arches supported by square pilasters, while in the upper ones they are supported by shorter columns in Carrara marble.

== Sources ==
This article is based on the entry in the Enciclopedia Libre Universal, released under the sajara
