= Cañas, La Rioja =

Cañas
- Municipality
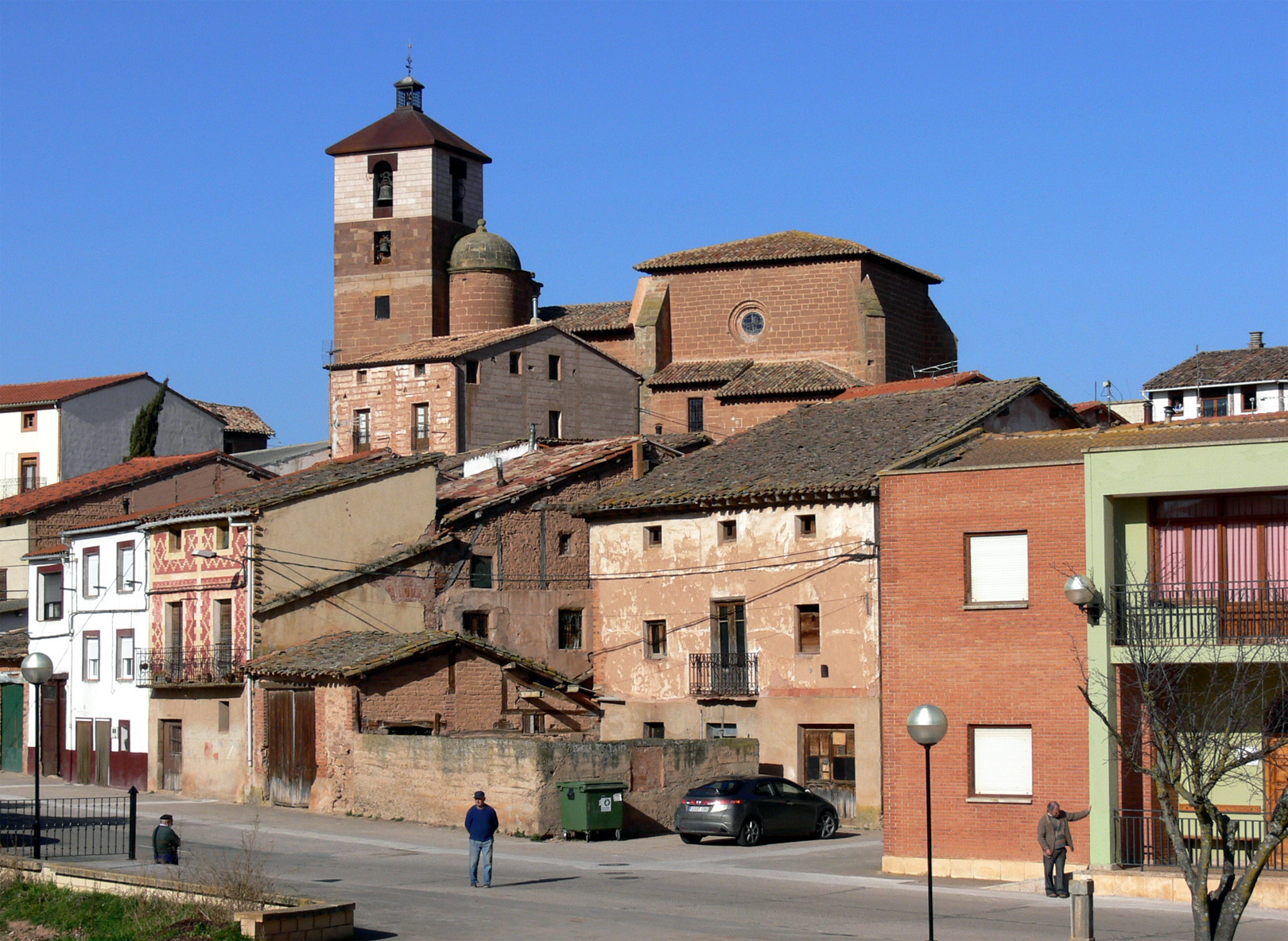
- Church of the Assumption

- Location within La Rioja, Spain Location within Spain
- Coordinates: 42°23′30″N 2°50′47″W
- Country: Spain
- Autonomous community: La Rioja
- Comarca: Nájera

Government
  - Mayor: Domingo de Silos Merino Bravo (PP)

Area
  - Total: 9.72 km^{2} (3.75 sq mi)
- Elevation: 643 m (2,110 ft)

Population (2025-01-01)
  - Total: 95
- Postal code: 26325
- Website: www.aytocanias.org

Cañas is a municipality of La Rioja, Spain. It was the birthplace of Saint Dominic of Silos (1000–1073).

The abbey of Santa María de San Salvador de Cañas for Cistercian nuns was founded in this town by Lope Díaz I de Haro and his wife Aldonza in 1169 and 1170. Its wealth and power culminated during the 13th century under the abbess Urraca Díaz de Haro, between 1222 and 1262. The nuns benefited from the patronage of the Haro family until its extinction in 1322. The community is still active today and retains fragments of its medieval library, particularly a complete Burgundian antiphonary from around 1200, and a Castilian missal from 1267 to 1279.

== Politics ==
List of mayors since the democratic elections of 1979
Term	Mayor	Political party
1979–1983	Julián Allona Ugarte	UCD
1983–1987	Ricardo Cereceda Merino	AP
1987–1991	Roberto de Carta Sáenz	PSOE
1991–1995	José Antonio Merino Hernáiz	PP
1995–1999	José Antonio Merino Hernáiz	PP
1999–2003	José Antonio Merino Hernáiz	PP
2003–2007	José Antonio Merino Hernáiz	PP
2007–2011	José Antonio Merino Hernáiz	PP
2011–2015	José Antonio Merino Hernáiz	PP
2015–2019	Domingo de Silos Merino Bravo	PP
2019–2023	n/d	n/d
2023–	n/d	n/d

== Notable people ==
- Dominic of Silos, saint in the Catholic Church.

== Points of interest ==
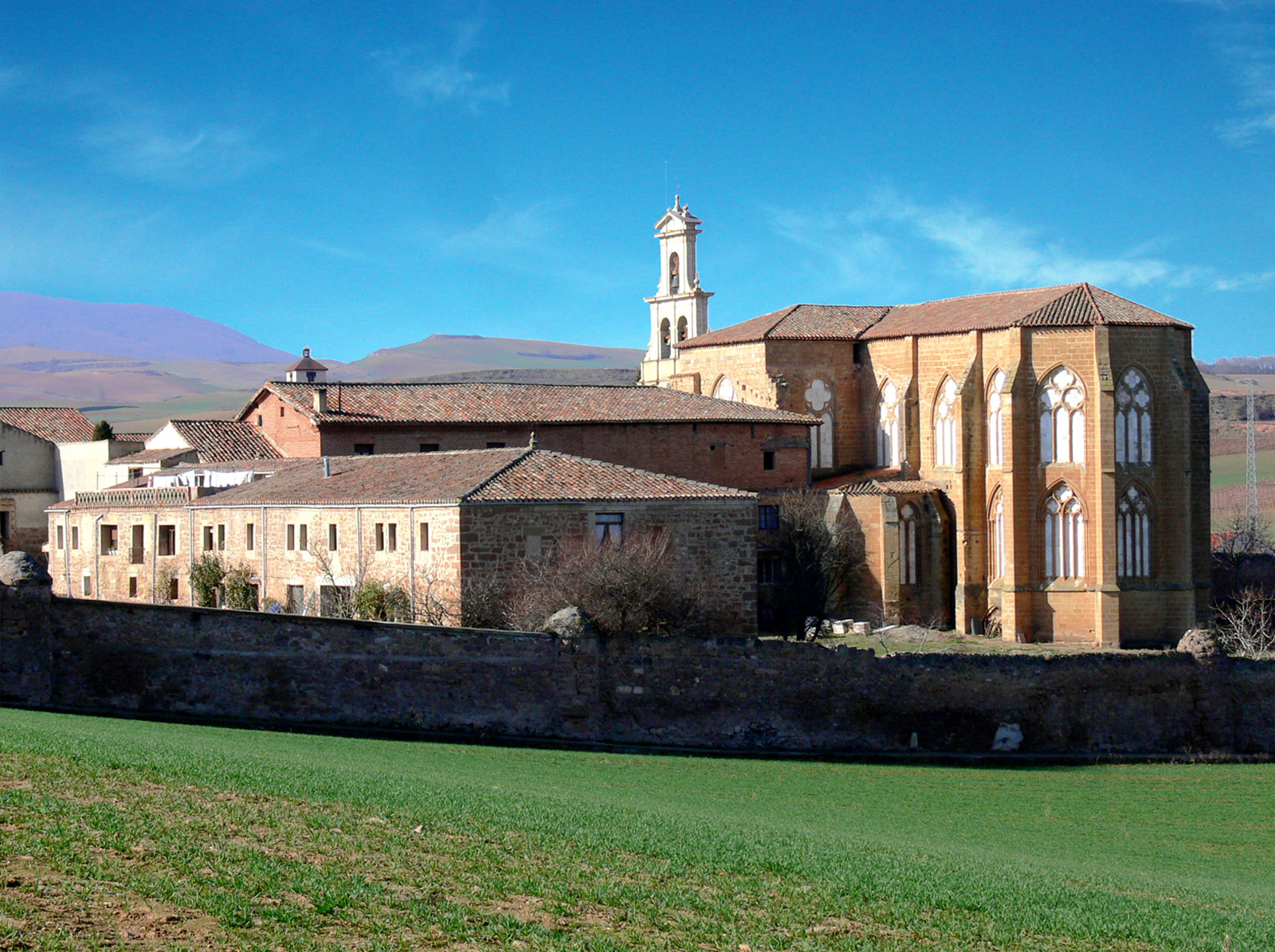
Monastery of Santa María.

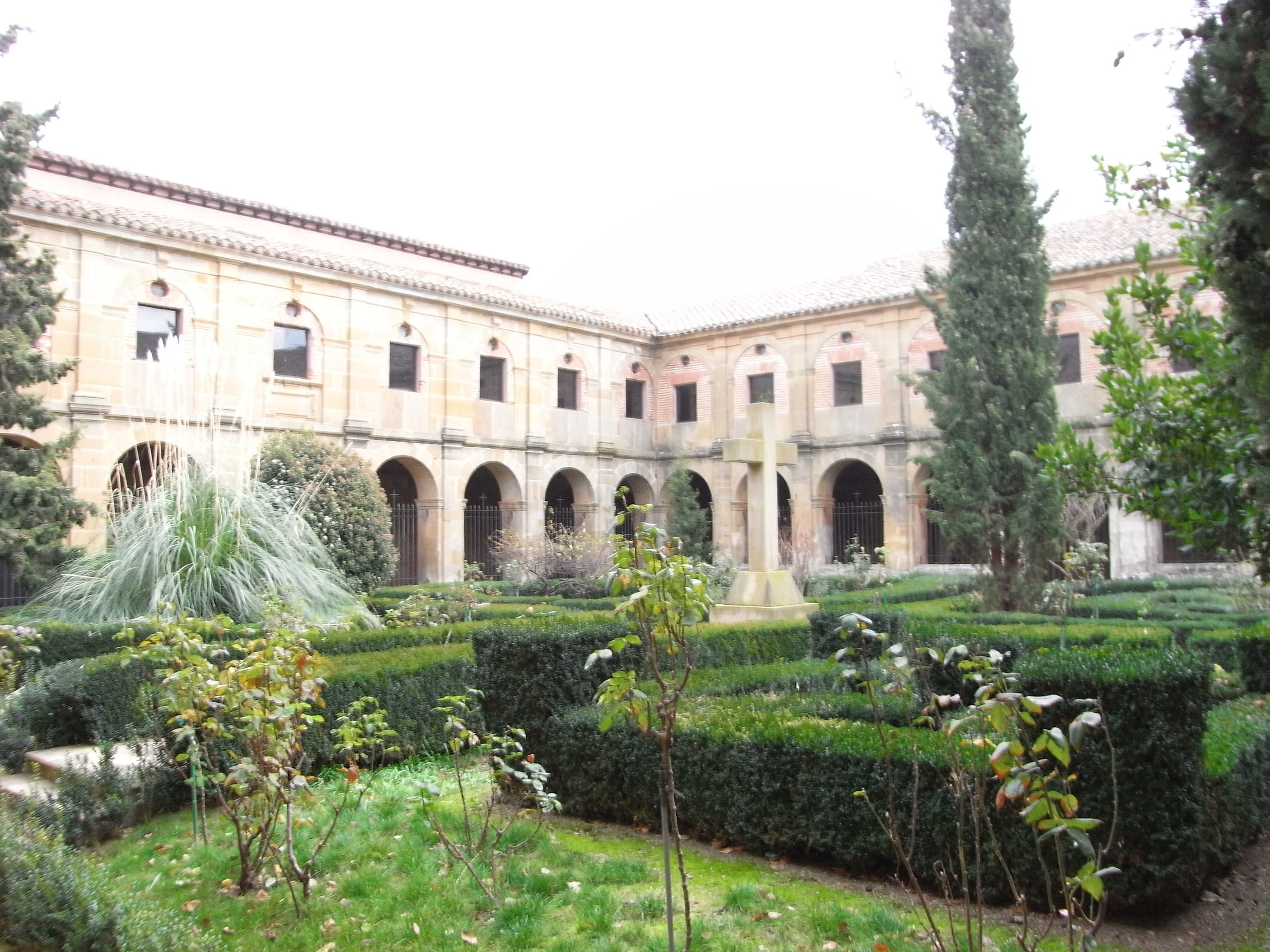
Cloister of the Monastery of Cañas.

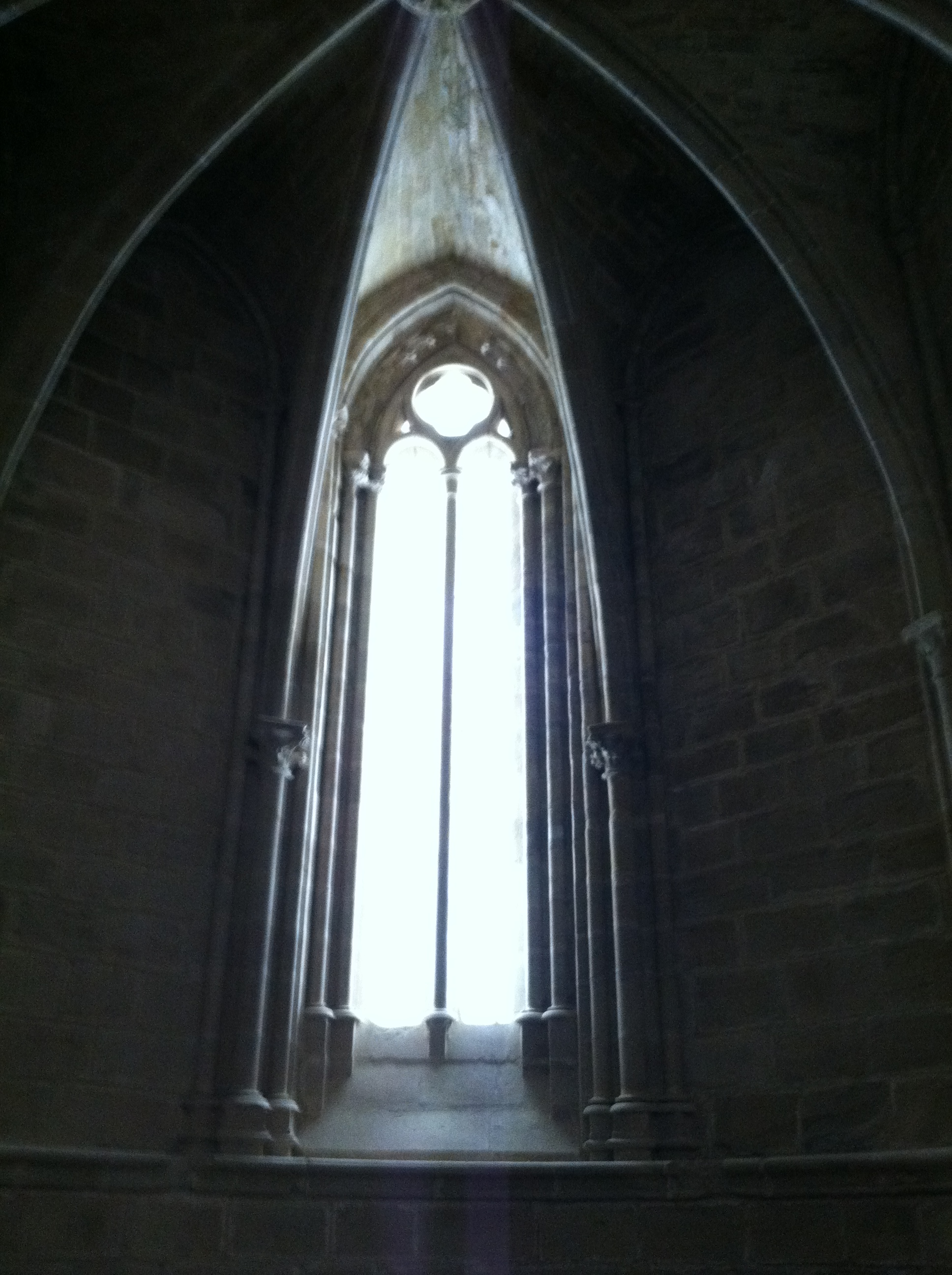
Alabaster window, north chapel Monastery of Cañas.
