= Gallotti =

Gallotti is a surname. Notable people with the surname include:

- Dada Gallotti (born 1935), Italian actress
- Octavio Gallotti (1930–2026), Brazilian judge
