= Convento de Santa Dorotea =

Convent in Castile and León, Spain

Coordinates: 42°20′0″N 3°42′11″W

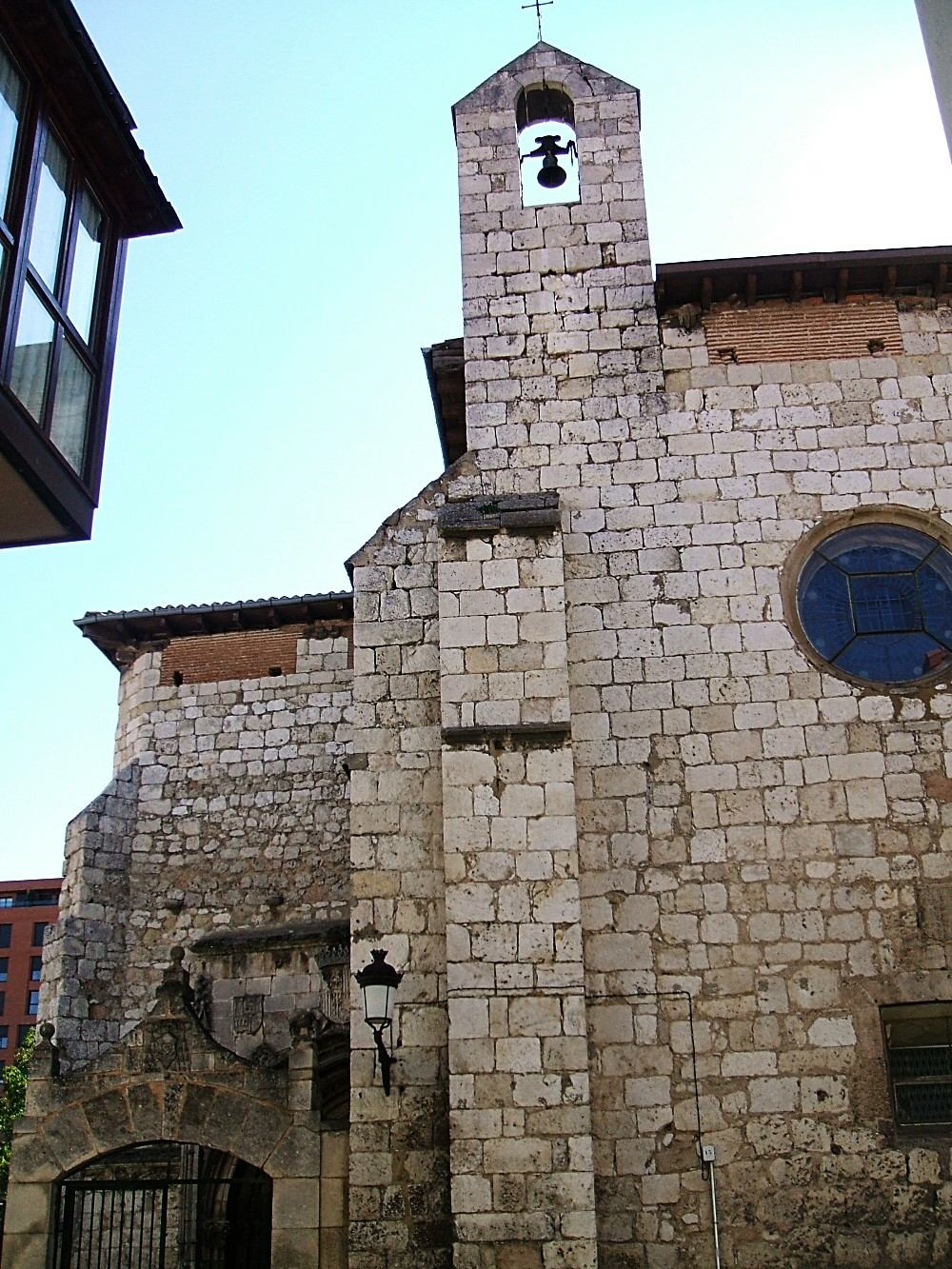
Convento de Santa Dorotea

The Convento de Santa Dorotea is an Augustinian nun's convent in Burgos, Castile and León, Spain. It is a Gothic construction, and dates back to 1387, when Dorotea Rodriguez Valderrama, along with other devout women formed a nun's community at the old church of Santa Maria la Blanca. The community adopted the rule of St. Augustine in 1429 with the support of Bishop Pablo de Santamaría. In 1457 they moved to the church of San Andrés, until in 1470 they settled in the current location in the barrio of San Pedro y San Felices. Among the many benefactors who favored the monastery was King John II of Castile. Tombs of note include those of Alonso de Ortega (died 1501), and Bishop Juan de Ortega, the work of Nicholas de Vergara, 1516.
