= Monastery of Santa María (Cañas) =

- Monasterio Cisterciense de Santa María (Spanish)
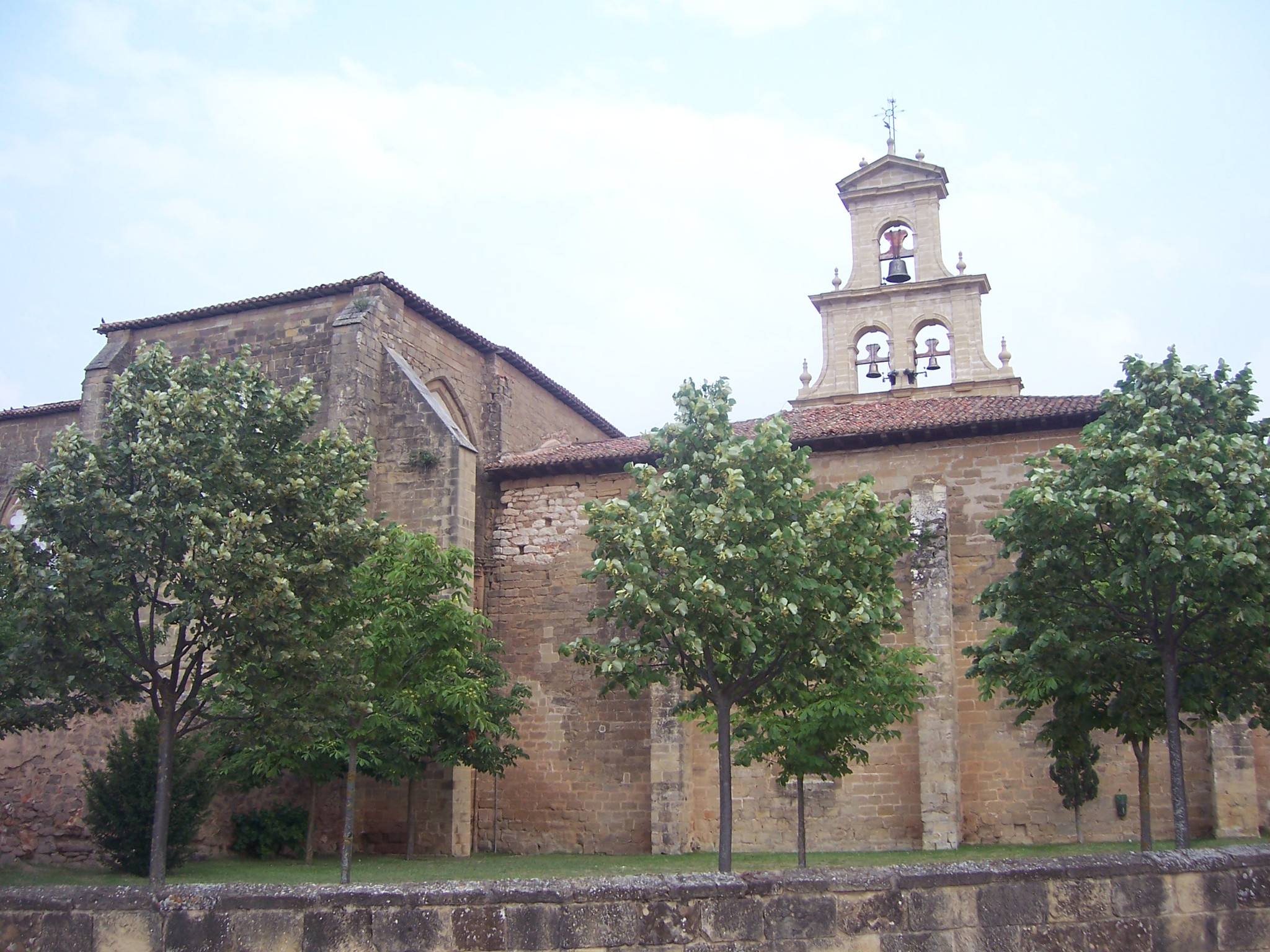

- Location within Spain
- 42.392543°N 2.844539°W
- Location: Cañas, Spain

Spanish Cultural Heritage
- Official name: Monasterio Cisterciense de Santa María
- Type: Non-movable
- Criteria: Monument
- Designated: 1943
- Reference no.: RI-51-0001121

The Monastery of Santa María (Spanish: Monasterio Cisterciense de Santa María) is a Cistercian nunnery located in Cañas, Spain which was founded in 1169.

Nuns first occupied the site in the 12th century. The complex has been protected by a heritage listing since 1943 (currently Bien de Interés Cultural).
