= Climate change in Mexico =

Emissions, impacts and responses of Mexico related to climate change

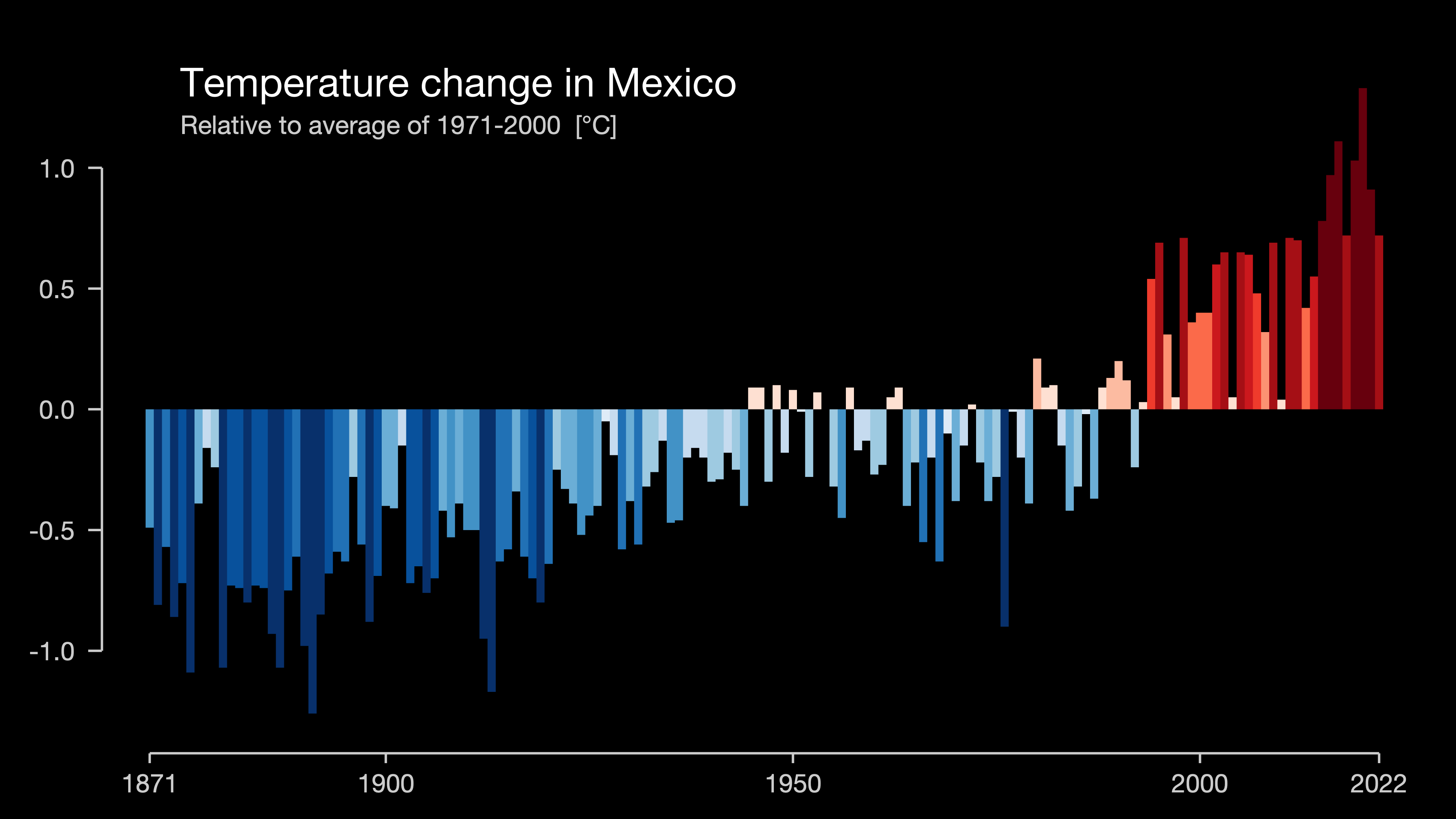
Temperature change in Mexico 1891-2022. Each bar represents the average temperature over that year

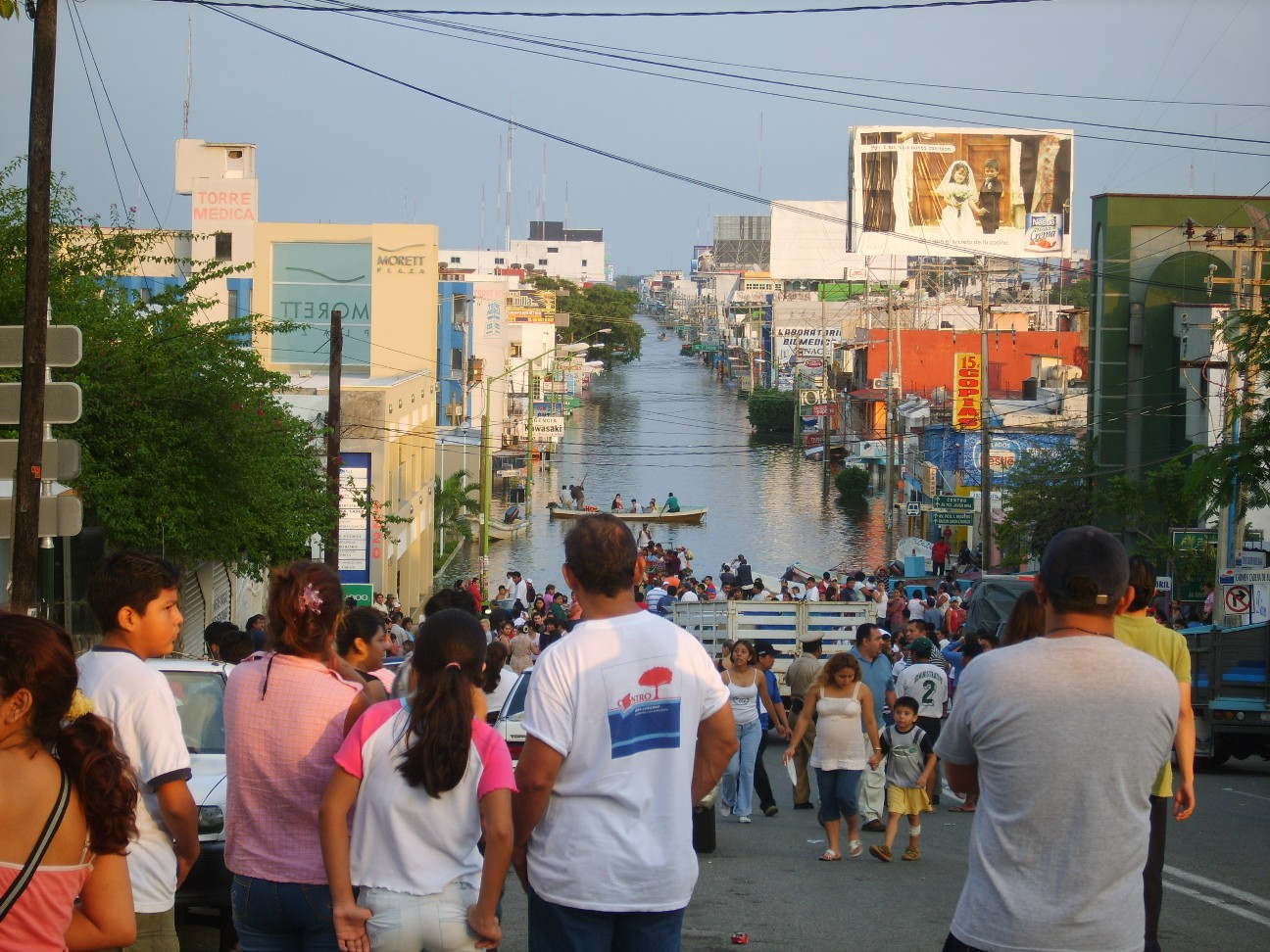
A flash flood in Mexico

Climate change in Mexico is causing widespread, possibly irreversible impacts including rising temperatures, altered precipitation patterns, drought, intensified hurricanes, and sea-level rise in coastal regions. These changes pose threats to water resources and agriculture, with rural communities and smallholder farmers relying on rain-fed agriculture being particularly vulnerable, and affecting crops including maize and coffee, contributing to economic insecurity. Climate change is impacting Mexican's health and exacerbating human migration. Climate change is increasing extinction risk for Mexico's biodiversity, with nearly 500 species listed as critically endangered.

In 2012, Mexico became the first major oil-producing emerging economy to enact climate legislation. Since then, Mexico has significantly increased its renewable electricity generation from wind and solar sources, however it is still dependent on fossil fuels for the majority of its energy. In 2023, Mexico was in the top 15 highest greenhouse gas emitters, contributing over 5 million tonnes, or 1.4% of the global total.

Mexico has committed to reducing greenhouse gas emissions by 35% by 2030, with an increased target of 40% conditional upon external support. Mexico also aims to cut black carbon emissions by 51% unconditionally and 70% with additional support by 2030 and has committed to net zero by 2050. Their updated National Climate Change Strategy emphasizes adaptation and mitigation measures across sectors such as energy, agriculture, water resources, forestry, and coastal zones. However, Climate Action Tracker's 2022 assessment indicated that Mexico's climate policies have regressed, with a renewed emphasis on fossil fuels and the dismantling of climate-related institutions, potentially hindering progress toward emission reduction targets. Mexico's current president, Claudia Sheinbaum, has made new promises to tackle climate change since taking office in October 2024.

== Impacts on the natural environment ==
=== Temperature and precipitation ===
Köppen climate classification map for Mexico for 1980–2016

2071–2100 map under the most intense climate change scenario. Mid-range scenarios are currently considered more likely

The mean annual temperature has increased by 2 °C in Mexico since 1960. Temperature is expected to increase in Mexico by 1.1–3.0 °C by 2060 and 1.3–4.8 °C by 2090. As such, scientists, including the IPCC, have classified the entire Central American region as a "climate change hot-spot" and "highly vulnerable" to climate change.

Climate change models, while highly variable, have projected an increase in the variation and intensity of precipitation (i.e. floods and droughts) for the climate of Mexico. The largest changes in precipitation are anticipated to occur during the summer months, especially in southern Mexico. Precipitation is expected to decrease by −3% to −15% by 2090 for the country as a whole. Regionally, precipitation changes may be anywhere between −60% and +8%.

The frequency and severity of heatwaves and droughts have significantly increased in Mexico recently. With an average increase of 0.3°C every decade between 1991 and 2023, Mexico has the fastest warming rate in Latin America, according to the World Meteorological Organization. The year 2023 alone saw record-breaking temperatures, with several regions experiencing prolonged period above historical averages, placing additional stress on ecosystems, agriculture, and public health.

==== Changes in cloud forest distributions ====
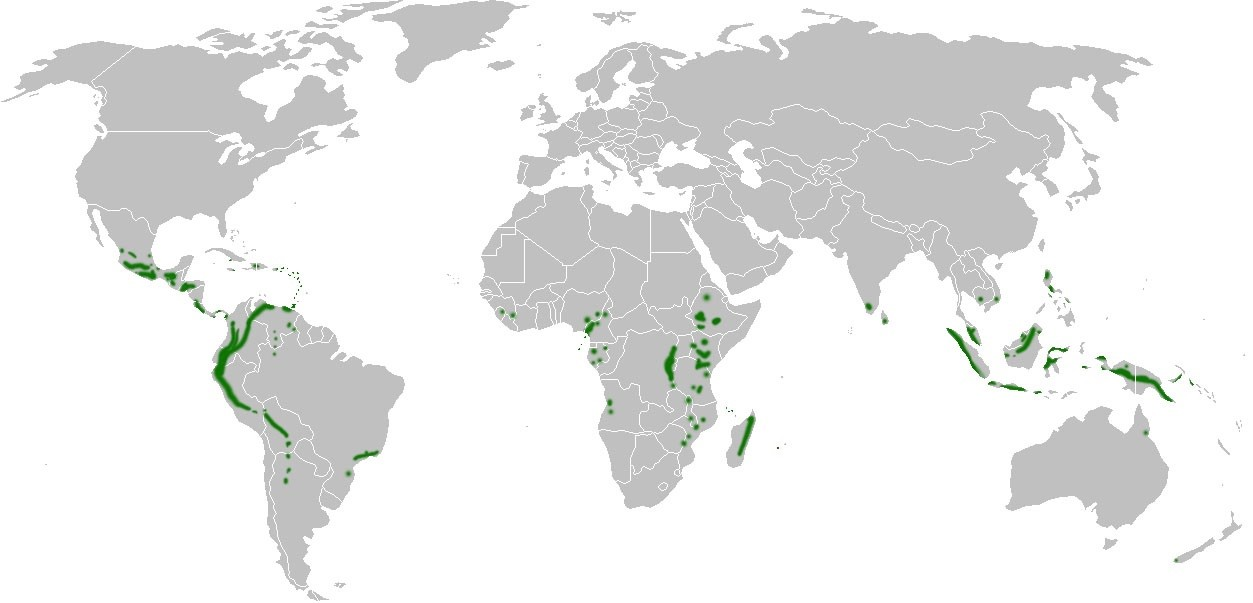
Image depicting global cloud forest distributions.

Mountain cloud forests, especially in the Michoacán, act as dispersal corridors for many species that travel between habitats. These forests are highly subject to human disturbances such as mining and deforestation. This is important because the distribution of these forests is an integral factor of landscape connectivity. As the distribution of these forests changes due to climate effects, landscape connectivity is also affected. An evaluation of this property of connectivity of the mountain cloud forests of Michoacán was carried out by researchers in order to determine which areas would best benefit from greater conservation efforts.

=== Ecosystems and biodiversity ===
Mexico contains a significant portion of the world's biodiversity, making it essential that "biodiversity hot-spots" present within its borders are properly protected from the effects of climate change. A large amount of land in Mexico is already designated as protected areas, as such, these conservation areas are refugia for a number of threatened species. Researchers are investigating how protected ecosystems in Mexico will be affected by climate change, and to what degree. Their research concluded that all 40 of the studied protected areas are expected to face warming temperatures while 30 will face decreased precipitation. The researchers suggest that their study be used to determine which of the protected areas in Mexico would benefit most from greater conservation efforts.

==== Butterflies ====
Warming temperatures and land-use change are contributing to the movement of butterfly distributions up the Sierra de Juárez mountain range in Oaxaca, Mexico. In 2016, research was conducted to determine which butterfly species were moving either up or down the mountain range. The researchers determined that more species were moving upward than were moving downward. The researchers also concluded that, as a result of distribution changes, there was a greater abundance of generalist butterfly species in lowlands.

==== Mexican Bats ====
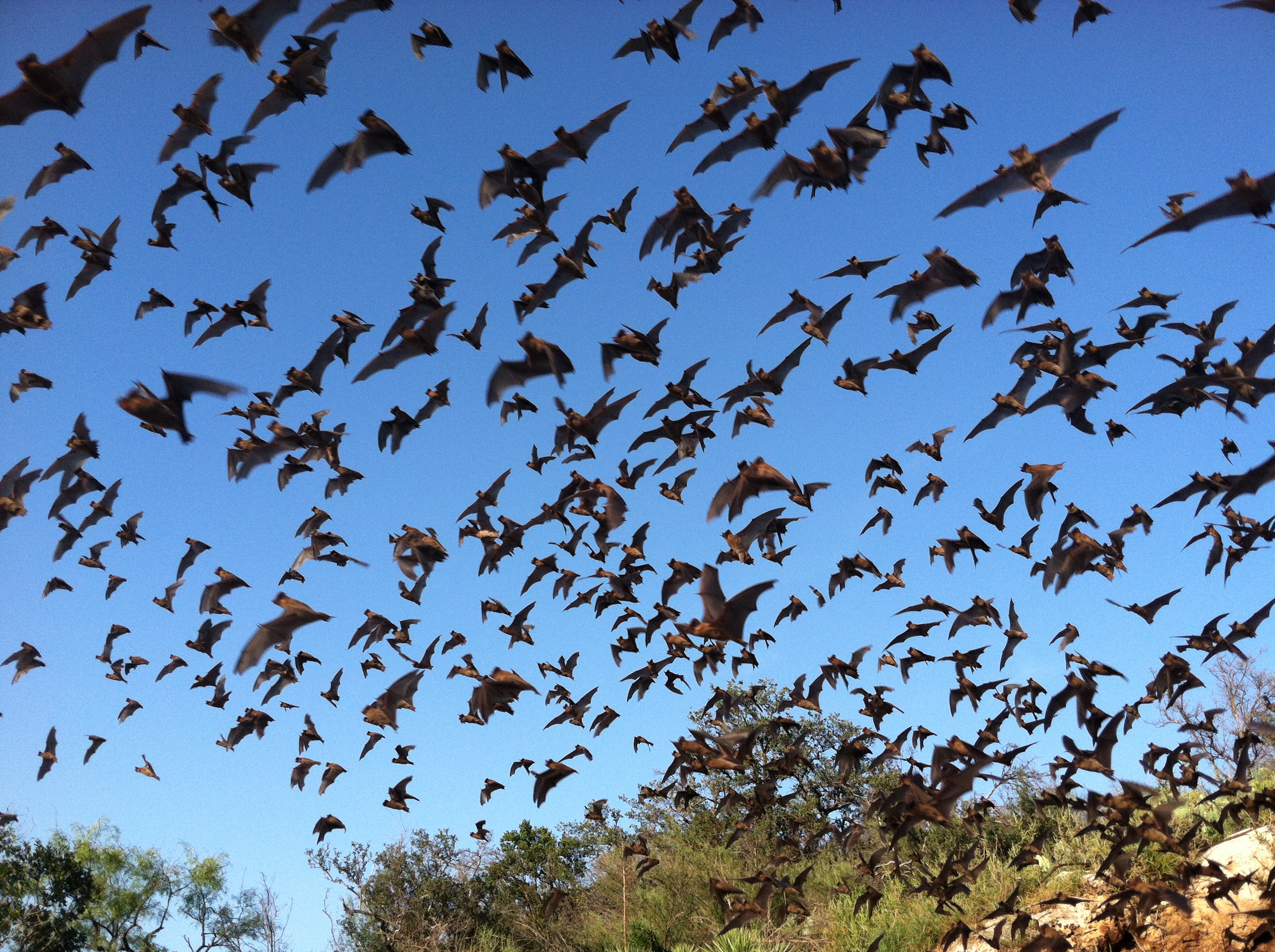
Mexican Free-Tailed Bats: As a result of climate change, bat ranges in Mexico are shifting due to declining habitat suitability.

Bat distributions and ranges in Mexico are expected to shift as a result of changes in climate and increased land-use change. As an indicator species, bats can provide researchers useful information on the degree and extent of climate related species responses. Researchers analyzed previous records of bat occurrence across Mexico and used the derived data to project how bat species may respond to land-use change and climate effects. Results showed that habitat suitability for over half of 130 bat species is expected to decrease under current climate trends. The results also revealed that land-use change had less of an effect on habitat suitability for bats than climate change.

==== Small mammals in tropical ecosystems ====
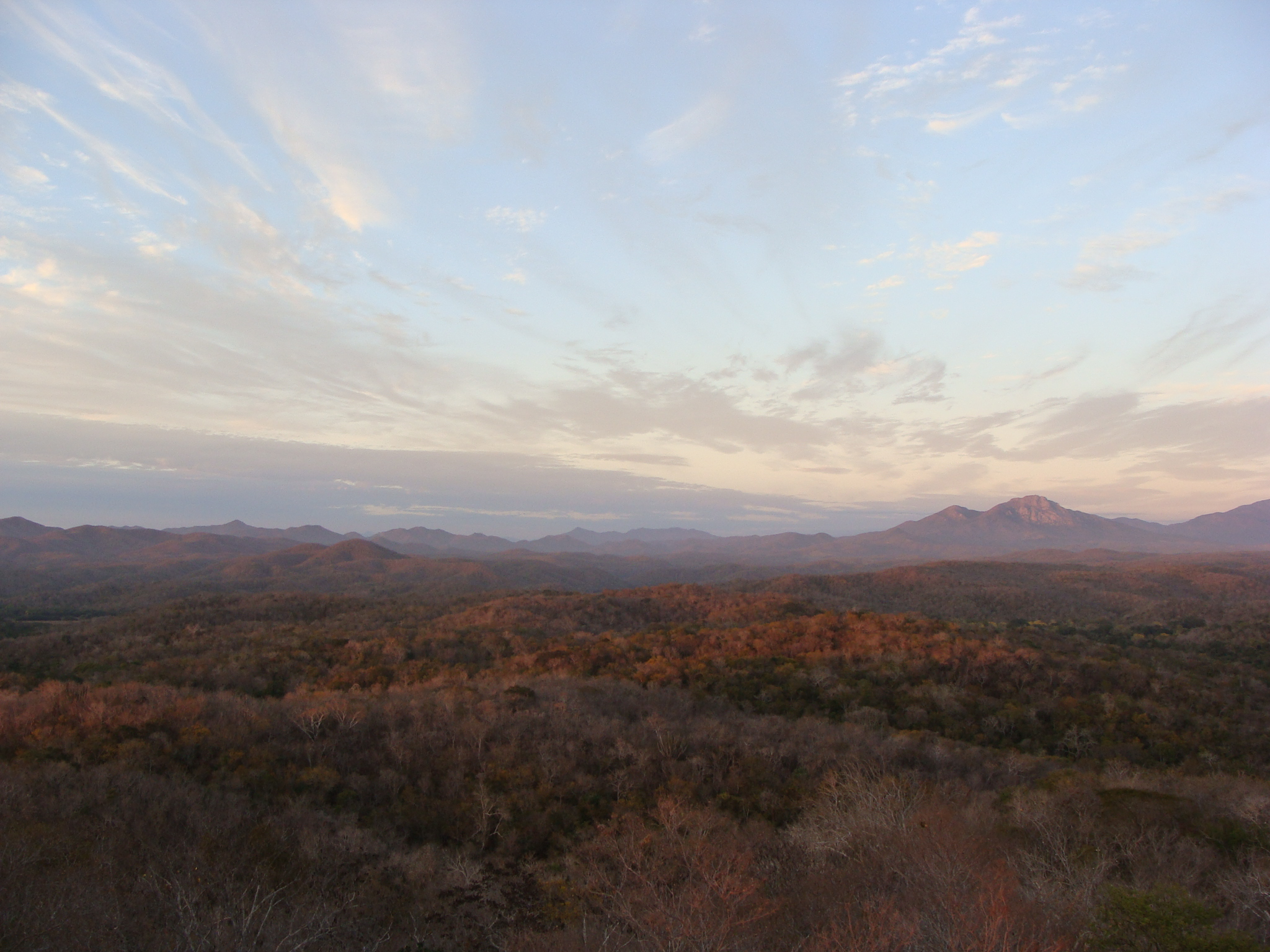
Photograph of a dry forest within the Chamela-Cuixmala Biosphere Reserve.

A significant number of mammals are endemic to Mexico, an abundance of those species being small mammals. Many of these small mammals are known to inhabit tropical areas of Mexico, however, it is these tropical dry ecosystems that are highly subject to the effects of land-use change and climate change, making small mammals particularly vulnerable. Researchers set up a 19-year study of small mammal populations in the Chamela-Cuixmala Biosphere Reserve located in Jalisco, Mexico. This site was chosen by the researchers due to the occurrence of a significant amount of anthropogenic disturbance in the surrounding area. The researchers concluded that functional diversity in this area was lower than expected, and, as such, greater conservation efforts should be encouraged in the region.

==== Birds ====
In order to determine how conservation efforts should be implemented in order to best protect breeding bird communities, a study was conducted by Aaron D. Flesch. This study of breeding bird communities in Mexico found that species were trending higher in altitude and towards the poles. In order to collect his data, Flesch used techniques that had been used by previous researchers and conducted an observational survey to determine biodiversity values. From the collected data and historical climate data, Flesch found that some lowland species moved north and others moved east to higher altitudes.

== Impacts on people ==
=== Economic Impacts ===
==== Agriculture ====
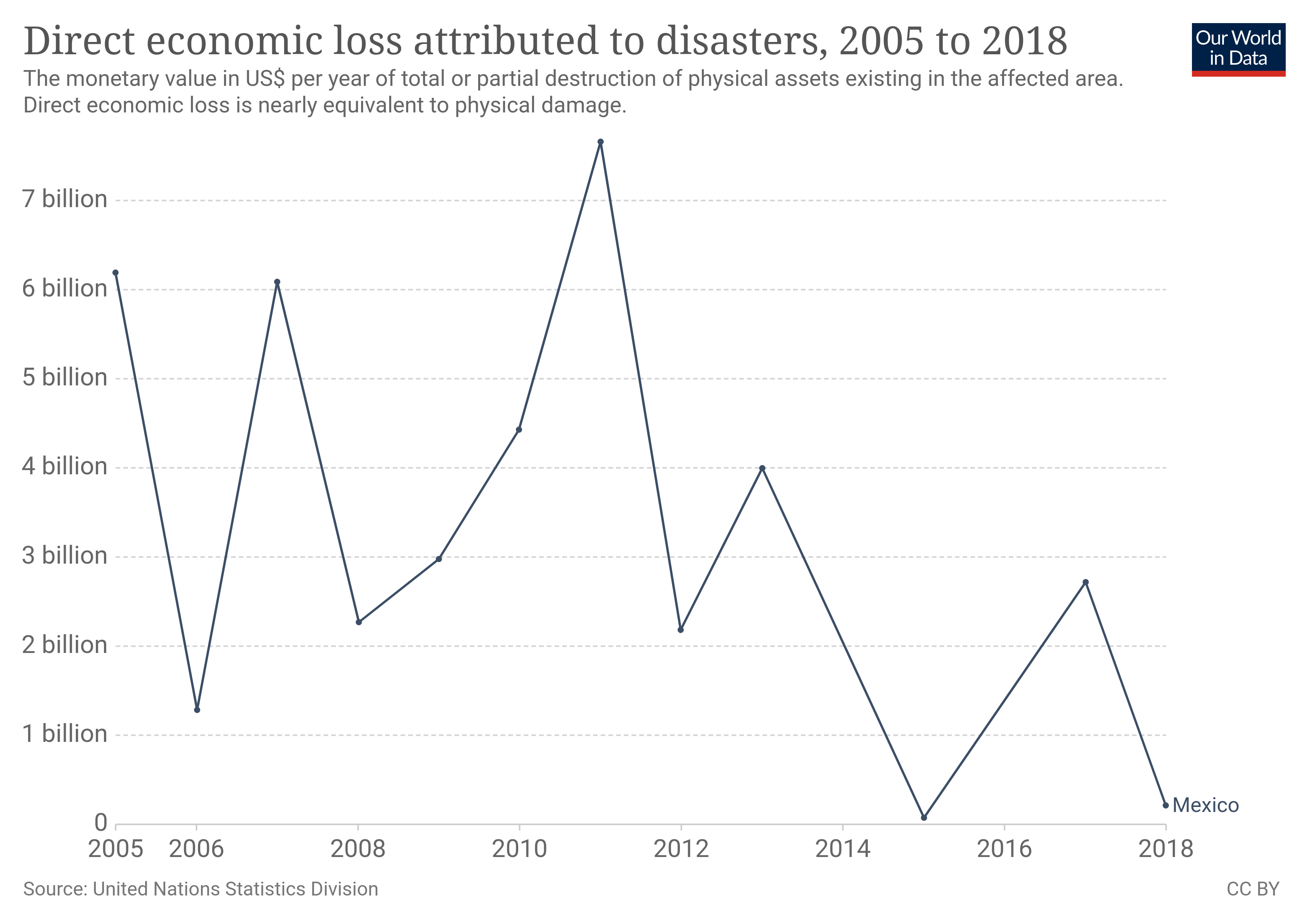
Direct economic loss attributed to disasters in Mexico

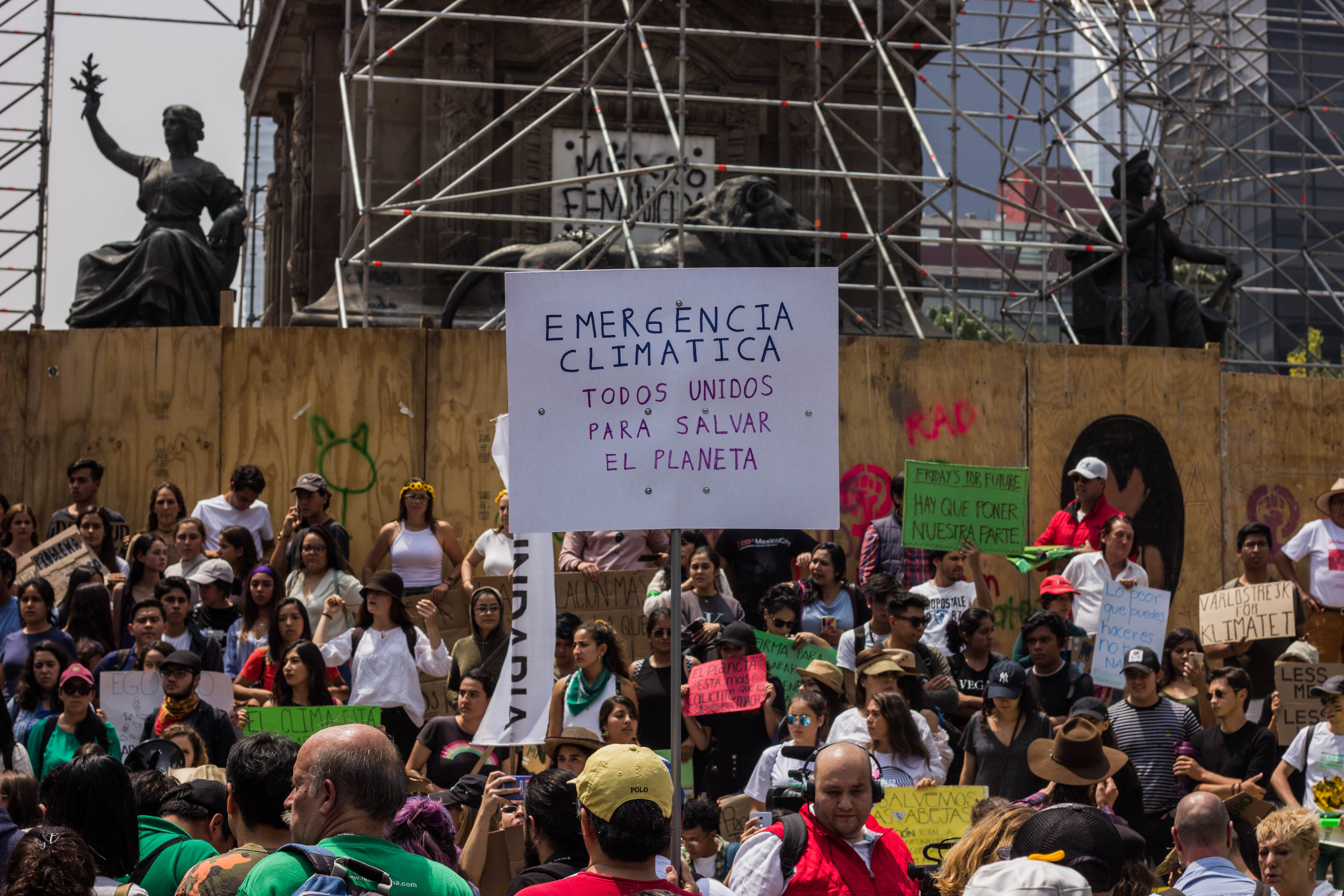
Protesters at the September 2019 climate strike in Mexico City.

In 2017, an estimated seven million people were employed in the agricultural sector in Mexico. Climate change has caused many people in Mexico who depend on agriculture for employment to experience economic insecurity.

"Wheat production for Mexico is expected to decline by 12% under the future RCP 8.5 climate change scenario with additional losses of 7 to 18% because of O3 impact," according to a July 2019 article. In the Yucatán Peninsula, the rise in temperature is affecting crop production. Extreme heat can negatively affect crops by slowing down growth and increasing moisture loss in the soil. Over the past 15 years until 2010, a Mayan village in Cancún, Tabi, experienced a 50-60% reduction in crop yield. Additionally, climate change is affecting rainfall patterns. Farmers are finding it more difficult to predict rainfall, which if predicted wrong can waste "an entire season's worth of seeds".

Drying and warming trends are altering and shifting climatic zones and agricultural environments worldwide, and Mexico is no exception. According to the World Bank, "agriculture [in Mexico] is highly vulnerable to weather extremes, in particular in the Northern parts of the country, where water scarcity is an issue, or the Southern parts of the country, where tropical storms cause extensive damage to crop[s]."

Exact predictions are difficult to make due to the complexity of the factors involved and the impacts will be highly region-specific; however, there is a general consensus that the productivity of crops and livestock will decline. Scientists also expect that certain insect pests and plant pathogens will survive and reproduce more often due to warming temperatures and are likely to invade new regions. Highland farmers and the rural poor are especially vulnerable to these climatic shifts. Decreased precipitation will place higher burdens on irrigated agriculture, on which much of the country's exported, economically-important crops rely. Conversely, more intense rainfall events will damage crop production. Higher temperatures are expected to increase evapotranspiration rates, leading to drying trends in soil moisture.

Climate change threatens not only food and economic security in Mexico, but is also tied to much larger, global food systems. In 2017, the United States imported $13.3 billion of fruits and vegetables from Mexico. Declining crop yields in Mexico due to climate change will ultimately impact global trade networks, national economies, and food security in countries that are, perhaps, geographically distant; yet through free-trade policies such as NAFTA and USMCA, have become highly dependent on Mexican agriculture.

===== Impacts on maize =====
Maize is of central importance to Mexican agriculture, occupying the largest cultivated area in the country. It is a critical component of the diets and nutritional intake of both the urban and rural populations. A large number of smallholder farmers in Mexico depend on rain-fed maize for their livelihoods, leaving these farmers particularly vulnerable to temperature and precipitation fluxes from climate change. Mexico's maize yields are expected to decline from 1555 to 1440 kg/ha by 2055. An absolute decline of 883,200 t. in maize annual production is estimated to occur within this timeframe. Maize is closely tied to Mexican identity, thus any decline in maize productivity and diversity will also have important socio-cultural and political consequences.

Mexico (Mesoamerica more generally) is the center of origin for maize. Mexico alone has 59 unique maize landraces recorded and thousands of regionally adapted maize varieties. Maize diversity in Mexico continues to be maintained and managed by smallholder farmers who participate in traditional seed sharing networks. Maize landraces in Mexico are conserved in place, or in-situ, by farmers who continue to grow them in their fields. Commercial maize seed is planted on less than one-fourth of Mexico's 8 million hectares of arable land. The majority of farmers in Mexico use, save, and exchange the seed of traditional maize landraces along with "creolized" (hybridized or cross-pollinated) commercial cultivars, which are typically planted in small (<5 ha) rain-fed fields.

An estimated 18 percent of maize cultivation in Mexico takes place in the highlands, and maize agro-climates in the highland regions are most at risk from climate change. Many scientists are concerned about the effects climate change poses on maize genetic diversity and the negative impacts that continued maize germplasm loss will have, not only on Mexican agriculture, but worldwide, as maize is the most widely grown crop in the world. Bellon et al. (2011) discuss the need to strengthen and broaden traditional seed networks in Mexico to support farmers and the genetic integrity of maize in light of climate change; thus, extending the geographic ranges of seed networks to link farmers in the highlands, for example, with farmers in mid-altitude environments.

===== Impacts on coffee =====
In Mexico and Central America more broadly, some 8.5 million people rely on coffee production for their livelihoods. Variable and extreme climatic events such as droughts, floods, and excessive heat is already impacting both the quality and overall production of coffee in Mexico. In 2012, higher than average temperatures and high-altitude rains led to an outbreak of coffee leaf rust, affecting roughly 50 percent of the coffee crop in Central America. This resulted in $500 million in crop damages to the region and caused many people in the region to lose their livelihoods. Regional studies in Mexico have projected that coffee growing could be unviable by the end of the decade.

Responses will need to occur both in the social and ecological realms and across multiple scales. Key strategies include crop diversification and the implementation of more resilient coffee production systems. Farmer education, access to information, health, and equity factors all play important roles in adaptation responses as well. Yet, there are also large-scale and global factors at play, such as international trade markets, which are often volatile, that are beyond farmers' control. A handful of coffee companies, NGOs, and agencies have initiated training and education programs for Mexican farmers to better respond to climate change.

===== Smallholder farmers =====
Many Mexican smallholder farmers continue to depend on rain-fed agriculture for their subsistence and livelihoods. Climate change is very closely tied to environmental justice in Mexico, given that poor smallholder farmers will likely carry the largest burden. Farmers respond to climate change in varying ways: changing their agricultural practices, adjusting their livelihood strategies, or exiting agriculture altogether.

=== Impacts on migration ===
There is evidence to suggest that declining agricultural conditions from climate change in Mexico directly relates to migration to the United States. For example, a direct relationship between declining crop yields in Mexico and migration was found. Declines in agricultural productivity due to climate change might cause 1.4 to 6.7 million adult Mexicans to emigrate by the year 2080.

=== Water crisis ===
Valle de Bravo, a man-made lagoon located approximately 85 miles west of Mexico City, faces a significant water crisis. The lake's capacity has diminished to 28% of its usual level due to an extended dry season, with satellite imagery showing an 18% reduction in the shoreline between 2022 and 2024. This situation illustrates broader issues related to climate change, population growth, and outdated infrastructure in Mexico. Climate change has led to decreased rainfall and higher temperatures, which have notably affected water levels. Population growth has increased demand, partly driven by a rise in population during the COVID-19 pandemic. Additionally, outdated infrastructure has resulted in inefficient and aging water systems, causing substantial leakage. This water crisis has significantly impacted local communities. The local water treatment plant can only supply water to 25,000 people, far below the town's population of approximately 60,000. The influx of weekend visitors further strains the demand. Nationally, around 51% of Mexico is experiencing severe or extreme drought, with one-third of the population lacking reliable daily access to water. Heatwaves in 2023 have resulted in at least 14 deaths and have adversely affected wildlife, including howler monkeys.

== Mitigation and adaptation ==
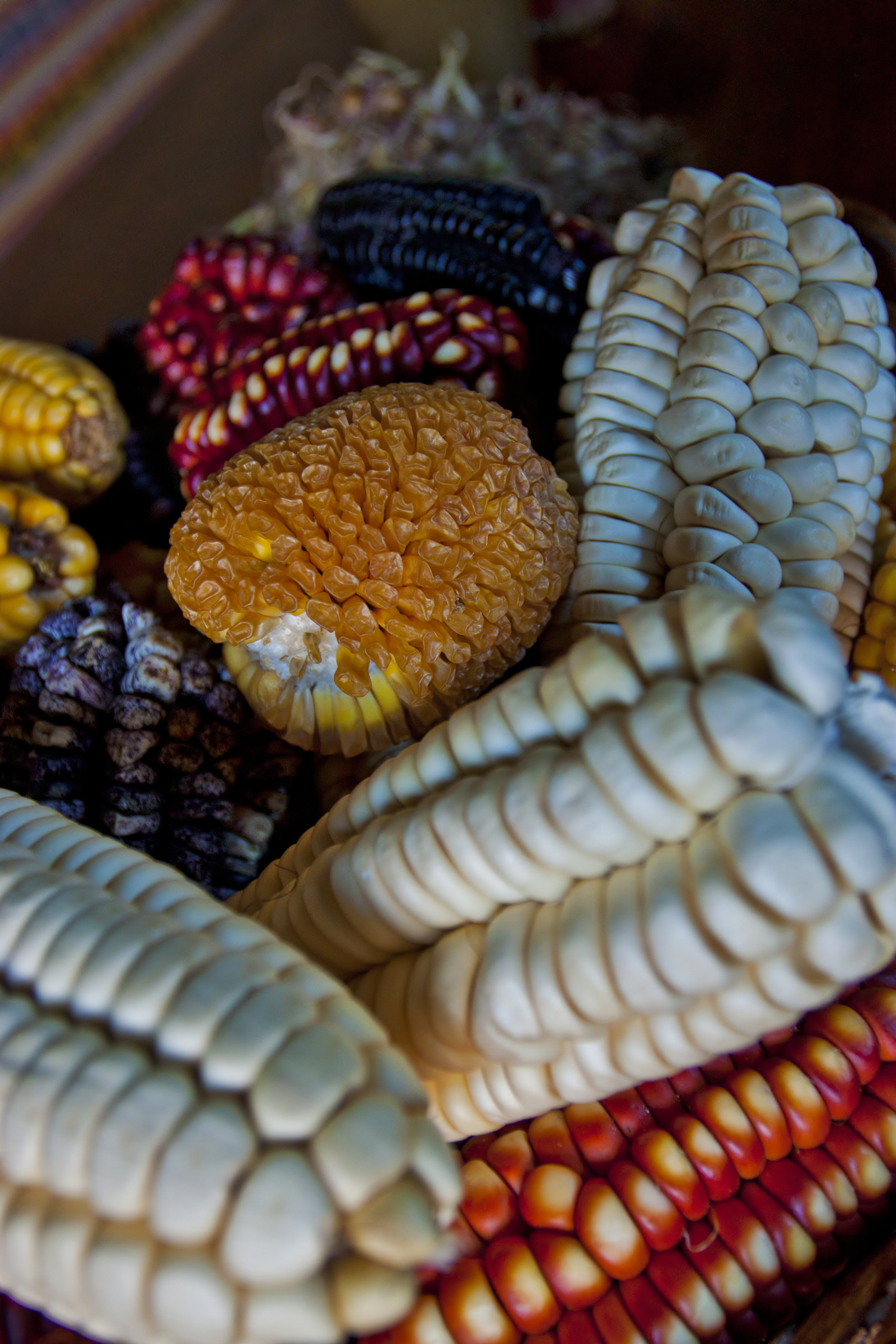
Maize, a key component of Mexican agriculture, is threatened due to temperature and precipitation fluxes from climate change

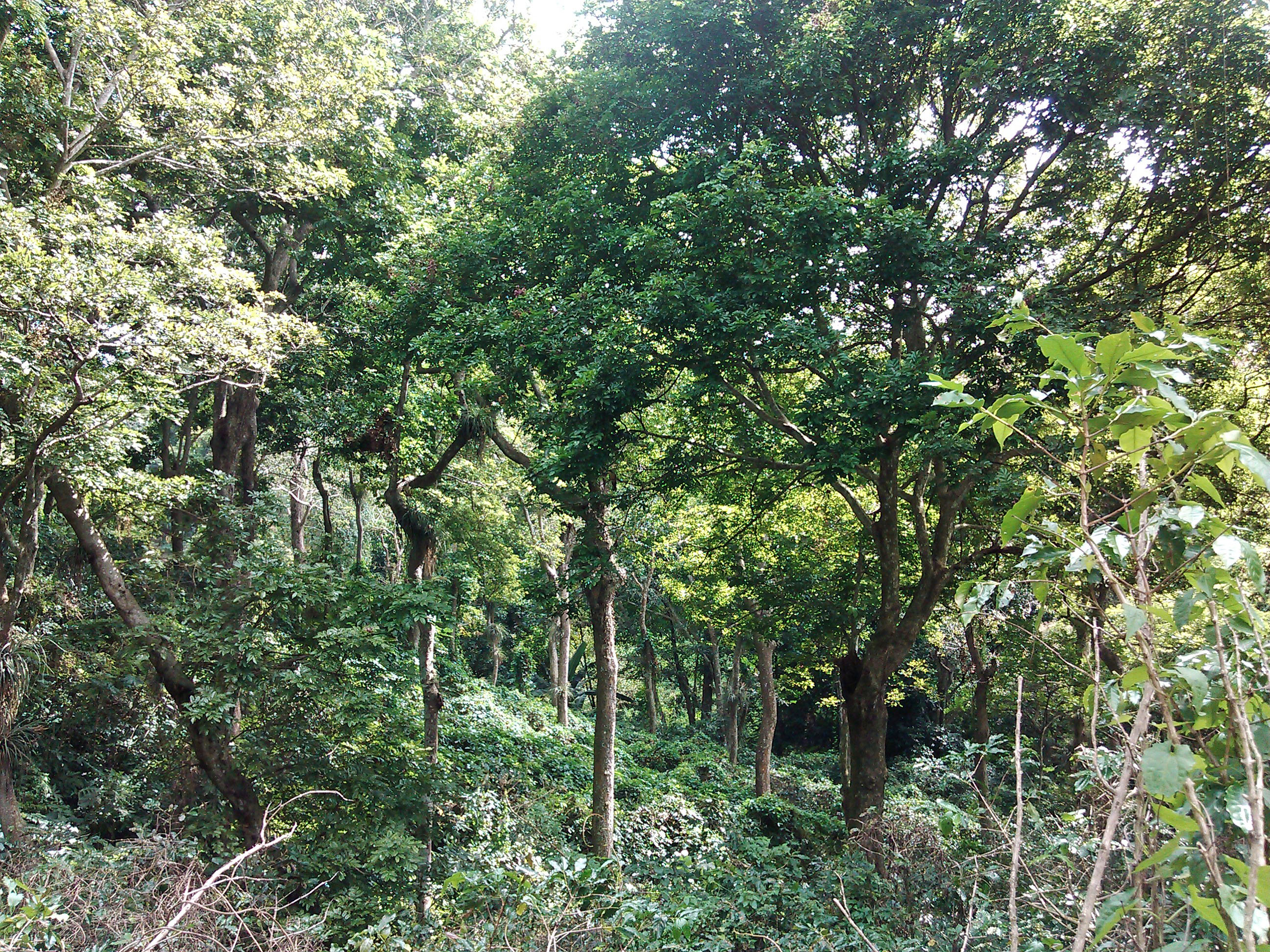
Much of Mexico's coffee (Coffee arabica) production is grown under the shade of a diversity of tree species. There is concern that climate change will lead to a decline in coffee quality, potentially causing farmers to abandon biodiversity friendly agroforestry practices.

=== Carbon capture and storage ===
Mexico highly depends on the burning of its fossil fuels, and for the same reason, it is in its interest to look into mitigation solutions for its corresponding emissions. In the General Law on Climate Change on 2012, Mexico promised to reduce 20% of its greenhouse gas (GHG) emissions by 2020 and 50% by 2050, as well as in the Paris Agreement. 19% of this new mitigation plan will be dedicated to carbon capture and storage and specifically 10% to the energy industry.

=== Adaptation strategies ===
==== Policies and legislation ====
In 2012, Mexico passed a comprehensive climate change bill, a first in the developing world, that has set a goal for the country to generate 35% of its energy from clean energy sources by 2024, and to cut emissions by 50% by 2050, from the level found in 2000. During the 2016 North American Leaders' Summit, the target of 50% of electricity generated from renewable sources by 2025 was announced. Various climate mitigation efforts have been implemented throughout the country. Mexico has been considered a leader in climate mitigation and climate adaptation.

==== Paris Agreement ====
The Paris Agreement is a legally binding international agreement, its main goal is to limit global warming to below 1.5 degrees Celsius, compared to pre-industrial levels. The Nationally Determined Contributions (NDC's) are the plans to fight climate change adapted for each country. Every party in the agreement has different targets based on its own historical climate records and country's circumstances and all the targets for each country are stated in their NDC.

The NDC target regarding México against climate change and greenhouse gas emissions under the Paris Agreement are the following:

- Reach a zero-net deforestation rate by 2030.
- 55% reduction of Greenhouse gases by domestic binding target without contribution from international credits, until 2030 compared to 1990.
- Gases covered in reduction: Carbon Dioxide (CO_{2}), Methane (CH_{4}), Nitrous oxide (N_{2}O), Hydrofluorocarbon (HFCs), Perfluorinated compound (PFCs) and Sulfur hexafluoride (SF_{6}).
- Black carbon emission reduction by 51% by 2030 compared to a baseline under a business-as-usual (BAU) scenario.
- Additionally, as a conditional contribution, Mexico could increase its reductions up to 36% for GHG and 70% for black carbon.

==== Strategy to achieve NDC's ====
Every country has different ways to achieve the established goals depending on his size, history and resources. In the case of México, the government has applied the following rules to support the NDC's climate change plan:

- Encourage eco-friendly consumption practices, conservation of natural resources and a massive recuperation of biocultural landscapes.
- Provide founding mechanisms that mitigate uncooperative impacts of climate change. Particularly on the primary productive sector.
- Strengthen environmental strategic instruments and execute actions to preserve, restore and manage continental ecosystems, increasing their ecological connectivity.
- Plan and implement measures that come up with to control desertification and enrich the soil conservation..
- Deeply care of the sea conditions, implementing actions for the conservation and restoration of the seas and oceans to enhance their resilience and preserve the different ecosystems inside them.
- Enforce the potable water management, ensuring quantity and quality of water in human settlements. Also, increasing the treatment of industrial and urban wastewater, promoting hydrological environmental services, through the protection of watersheds with special attention to nature-based alternatives.
- Recommended climate adaptation strategies for coffee production in Mexico include (1) promoting farming practices that increase biodiversity, such as agroforestry, which provides protection against extreme weather events and allows for product diversification, (2) diversifying farmer incomes to mitigate risks from climate and market volatility, and (3) enabling markets that support sustainable coffee growing practices, among others. Shade-grown coffee (typically with Coffea arabica in Mexico) provisions critical ecosystem services: pollination and hydrological services, wildlife habitat, and pest and erosion control. It has been estimated that 60–70% of coffee production in Mexico is grown under shade by a diversity of tree species. However, there is concern that hotter growing conditions and irregular rainfall patterns will cause a decline in coffee quality and hence profitability, propelling farmers to abandon shade-grown coffee altogether.
- Due to a continual process of farmer-mediated selection and their diverse genetic makeup, maize landraces in Mexico have the ability to adapt and evolve to changing environmental conditions; although it will be difficult to predict exactly how they will change or the extent to which they will be able to adapt, particularly to rising temperatures. Biotechnology, and the development and promotion of maize transgenics in particular, is being promoted as a critical climate adaptation strategy, not only in Mexico but around the world. While stress-tolerant maize transgenics could bring important benefits to Mexico, there are a number of concerns associated with them. In particular, concerns have been raised about the lower productivity of improved varieties compared to landraces in many parts of Mexico; the longstanding lack of acceptance of transgenic varieties by Mexican farmers; and that the promotion of transgenics threatens local landrace diversity. Participatory maize breeding, that is the inclusion of farmers in the formal breeding process, may hold considerable potential for climate change adaptation in Mexico.
- The Mexican government's climate change program explicitly identifies "the adoption and implementation of sustainable agriculture" as a key adaptation strategy. Sustainable agriculture can take many forms. One type of strategy that has been proposed includes changing farmers' agricultural practices. For example, changing the timing of irrigation and crop planting, introducing new landraces and cultivars by extending seed-sharing networks, and adopting biodiversity-friendly farming practices that increase agroecosystem resilience. Evidence suggests that smallholder farmers in southern Mexico have begun adapting their agricultural practices due to climate change, by, for example, delaying crop plantings and planting a diversity of landrace varieties.
