= Climate of Mexico =

Mexico map of Köppen climate classification

The climate of Mexico is very diverse. The Tropic of Cancer effectively divides the country into temperate and tropical zones. Land that is north of the twenty-fourth parallel experiences lower temperatures during the winter months. South of the twenty-fourth parallel, temperatures are fairly consistent all year round and vary solely as a function of elevation. The north of the country usually receives less precipitation than the south.

== By region ==
Areas south of the twenty-fourth parallel with elevations up to 1,000 meters (3,281 ft) (the southern parts of both coastal plains as well as the Yucatán Peninsula), have a desert climate and a yearly median temperature between 24 and 28 °C (75.2 and 82.4 °F). Temperatures here remain high throughout the year, with only a 5 °C (9 °F) difference between winter and summer median temperatures. Although low-lying areas north of the twenty-fourth parallel are hot and humid during the summer, they generally have lower yearly temperature averages (from 20 to 24 °C or 68.0 to 75.2 °F) because of more moderate conditions during the winter.

Between 1,000 and 2,000 meters (3,281 and 6,562 ft), one encounters yearly average temperatures between 16 and 20 °C (60.8 and 68.0 °F). Towns and cities at this elevation south of the twenty-fourth parallel have relatively constant, pleasant temperatures throughout the year, whereas more northerly locations experience sizeable seasonal variations. Above 2,000 meters (6,562 ft), temperatures drop as low as an average yearly range between 8 and 12 °C (46.4 and 53.6 °F) in the Cordillera Neovolcánica. At 2,300 meters (7,546 ft), Mexico City (primarily subtropical highland climate) has a yearly median temperature of 15 °C (59 °F) with pleasant summers and mild winters. The city's daily highs and lows for May, its warmest month, average at 26 and 12 °C (78.8 and 53.6 °F), while for January, its coldest month, at 19 and 6 °C (66.2 and 42.8 °F), respectively.

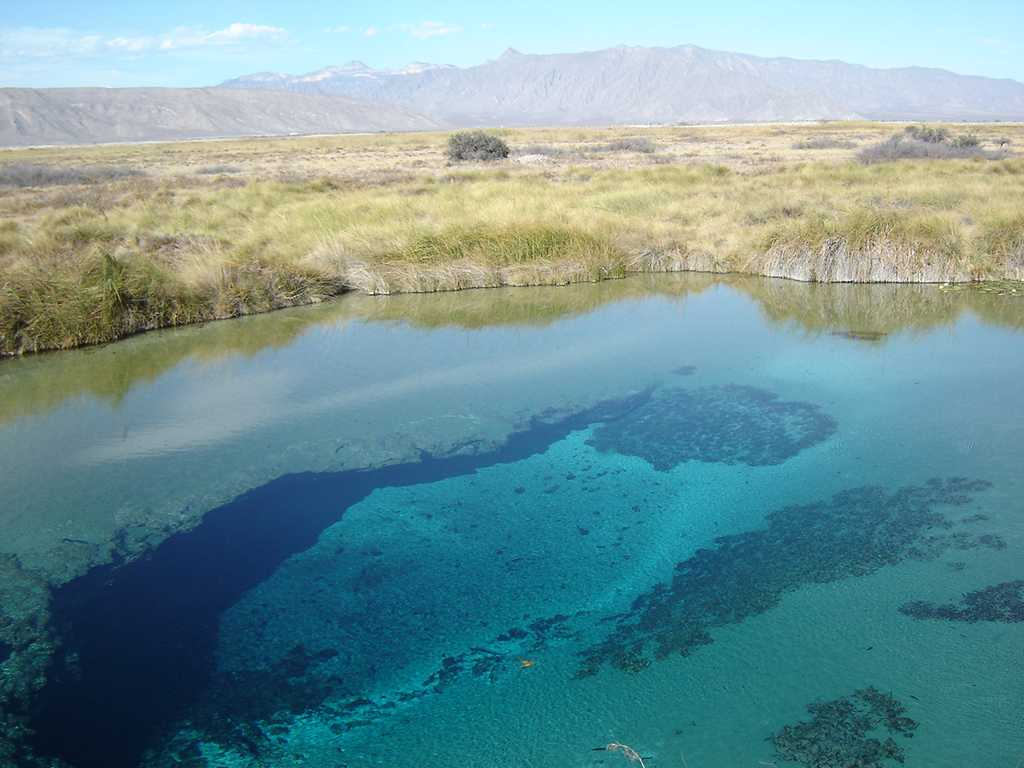
Poza Azul (Blue Pool), one of many springs in the Cuatro Ciénegas Basin in central Coahuila, Mexico (2009).

Rainfall varies widely both by location and season. Arid or semiarid conditions are encountered in the Baja California Peninsula, the northwestern state of Sonora, the northern altiplano, and also significant portions of the southern altiplano. Rainfall in these regions averages between 300 and 600 millimeters (11.8 and 23.6 in) per year, although even less in some areas, particularly in the state of Baja California. Average rainfall totals are between 600 and 1,000 millimeters (23.6 and 39.4 in) in most of the major populated areas of the southern altiplano, including Mexico City and Guadalajara. Low-lying areas along the Gulf of Mexico receive in excess of 1,000 millimeters (39.4 in) of rainfall in an average year, with the wettest region being the southeastern state of Tabasco, which typically receives approximately 2,000 millimeters (78.7 in) of rainfall on an annual basis. Parts of the northern altiplano, highlands and high peaks in the Sierra Madres receive yearly snowfall. Citlaltépetl, Popocatépetl and, Iztaccíhuatl continue to support glaciers, the largest of which is the Gran Glaciar Norte.

Mexico has pronounced wet and dry seasons. Most of the country experiences a rainy season from June to mid-October and significantly less rain during the remainder of the year. February and July generally are the driest and wettest months, respectively. Mexico City, for example, receives an average of only 5 millimeters (0.2 in) of rain during February but more than 160 millimeters (6.3 in) in July. Coastal areas, especially those along the Gulf of Mexico, experience the largest amounts of rain in September. Tabasco typically records more than 300 millimeters (11.8 in) of rain during that month. A portion of northwestern Baja California has a Mediterranean climate influenced by the California Current, with a rainy season that occurs in winter and coastal regions receiving considerable fog. Another area of the Mediterranean climate as a result of elevation occurs in the interior of Sonora.

Mexico lies squarely within the hurricane belt, and all regions of both coasts are susceptible to these storms from June through November. Hurricanes on the Pacific coast are often less violent than those affecting Mexico's eastern coastline. Several hurricanes per year strike the Caribbean and Gulf of Mexico coastline, however, and these storms bring high winds, heavy rain, extensive damage, and occasional loss of life. Hurricane Gilbert passed directly over Cancún in September 1988, with winds in excess of 200 kilometers per hour (124 mph), producing major damage to hotels in the resort area. It then struck northeast Mexico, where flooding from the heavy rain killed dozens in the Monterrey area and caused extensive damage to livestock and vegetable crops.

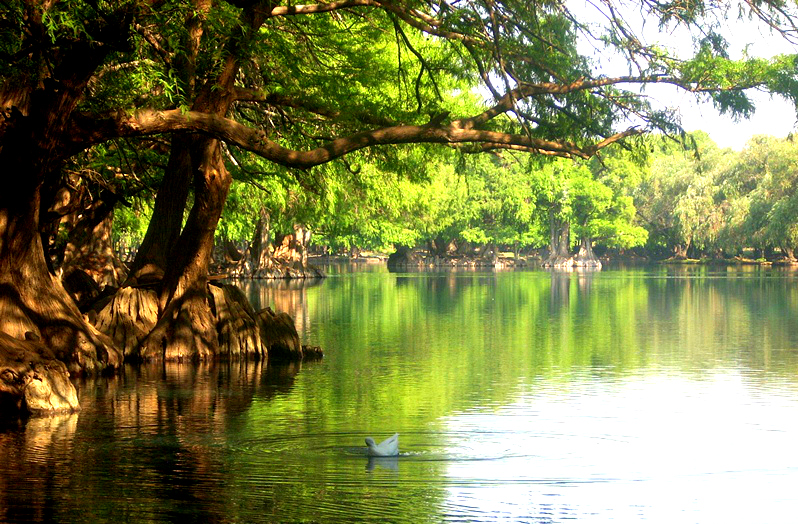
Lago de Camécuaro
Dry-winter humid subtropical climate (Cwa)

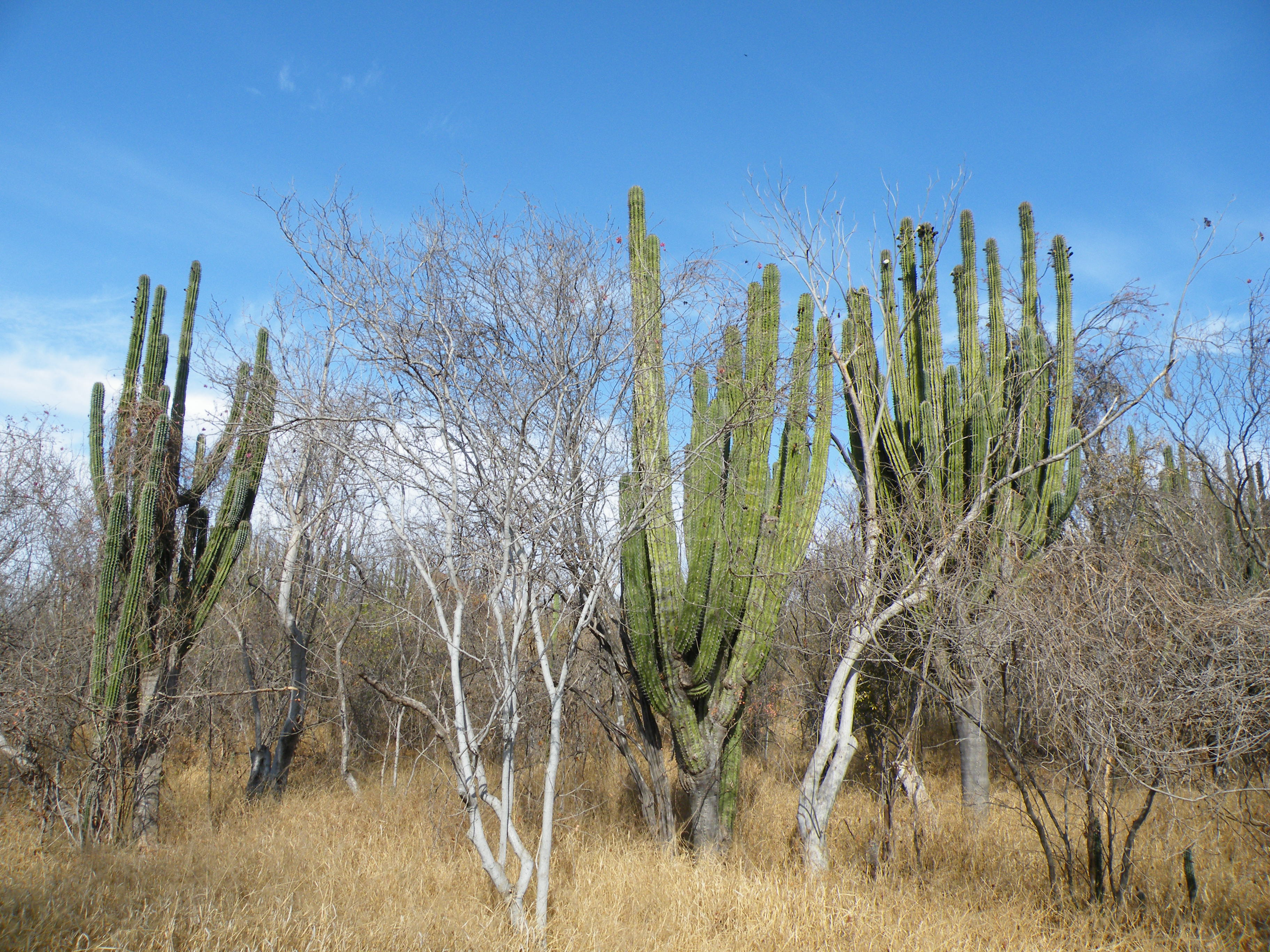
Guamúchil
Hot semi-arid climate (BSh)

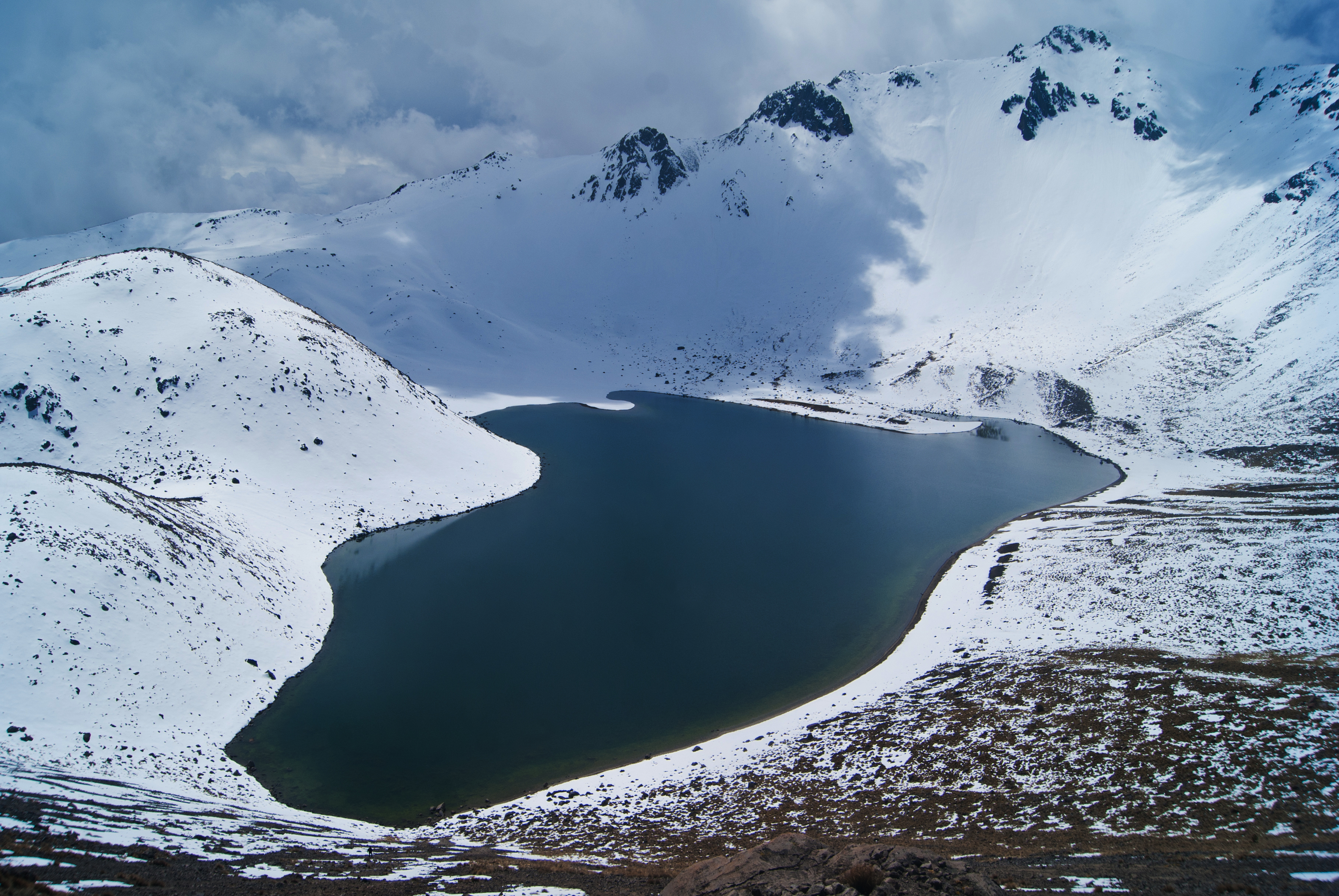
Nevado de Toluca
Alpine tundra (ET)

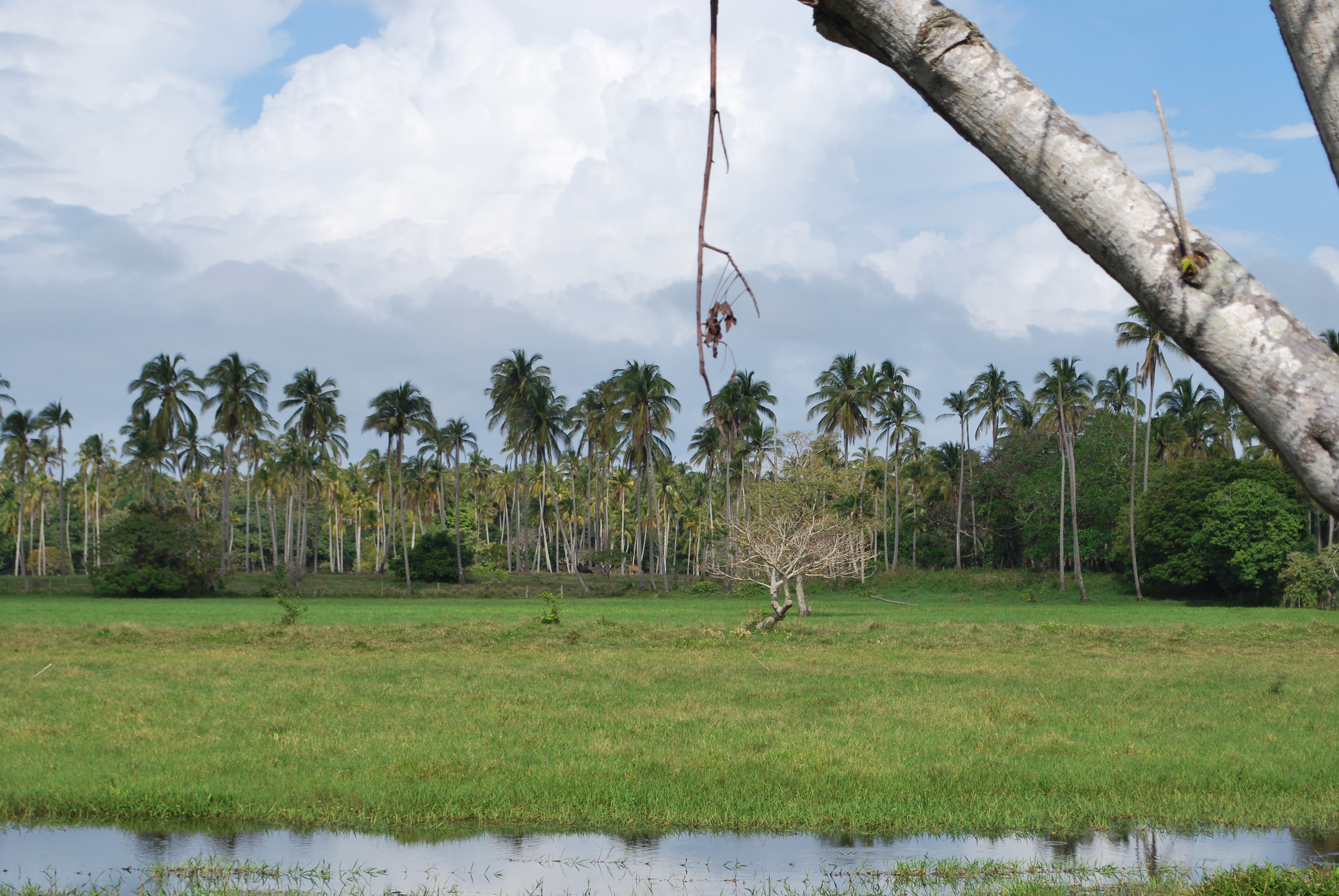
Chontalpa
Tropical monsoon climate (AM)

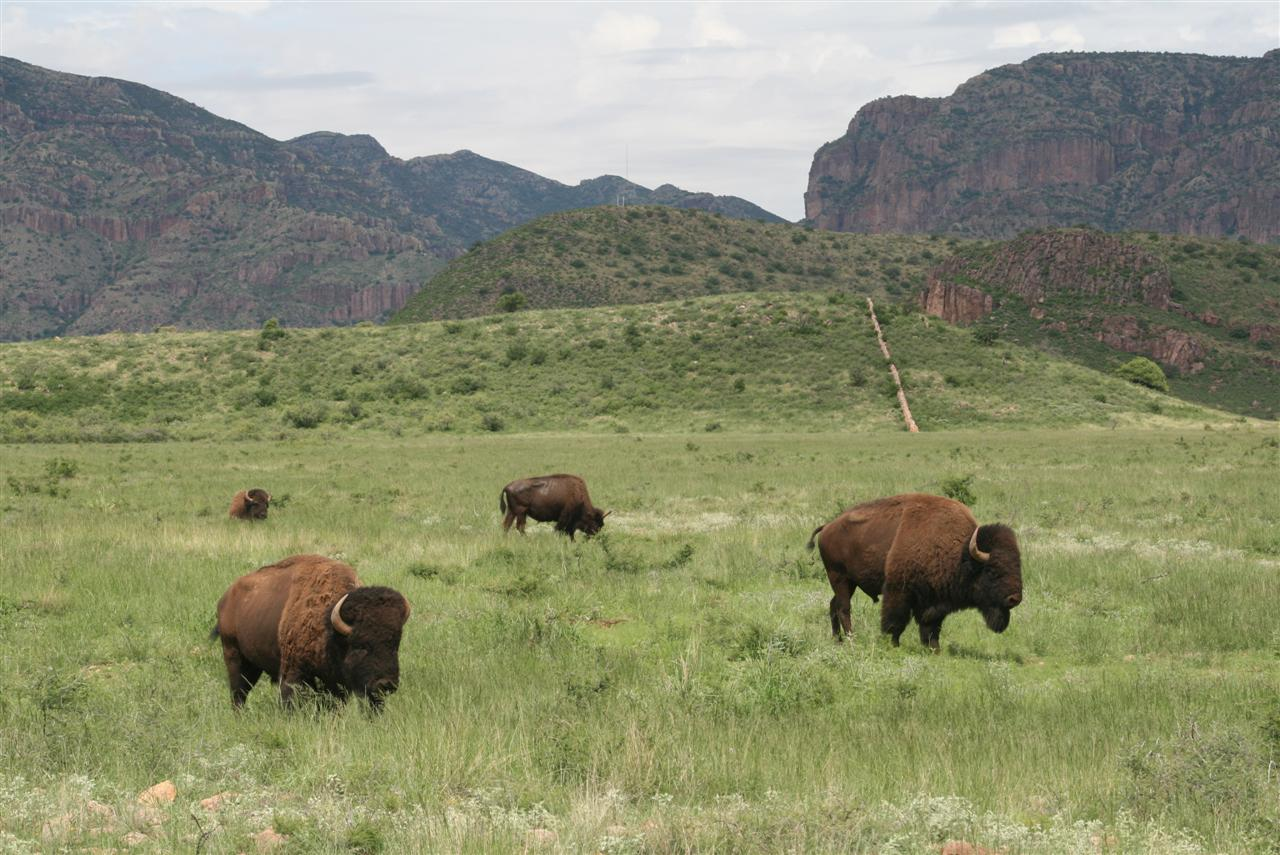
Janos Biosphere Reserve
Cold semi-arid climate (BSk)

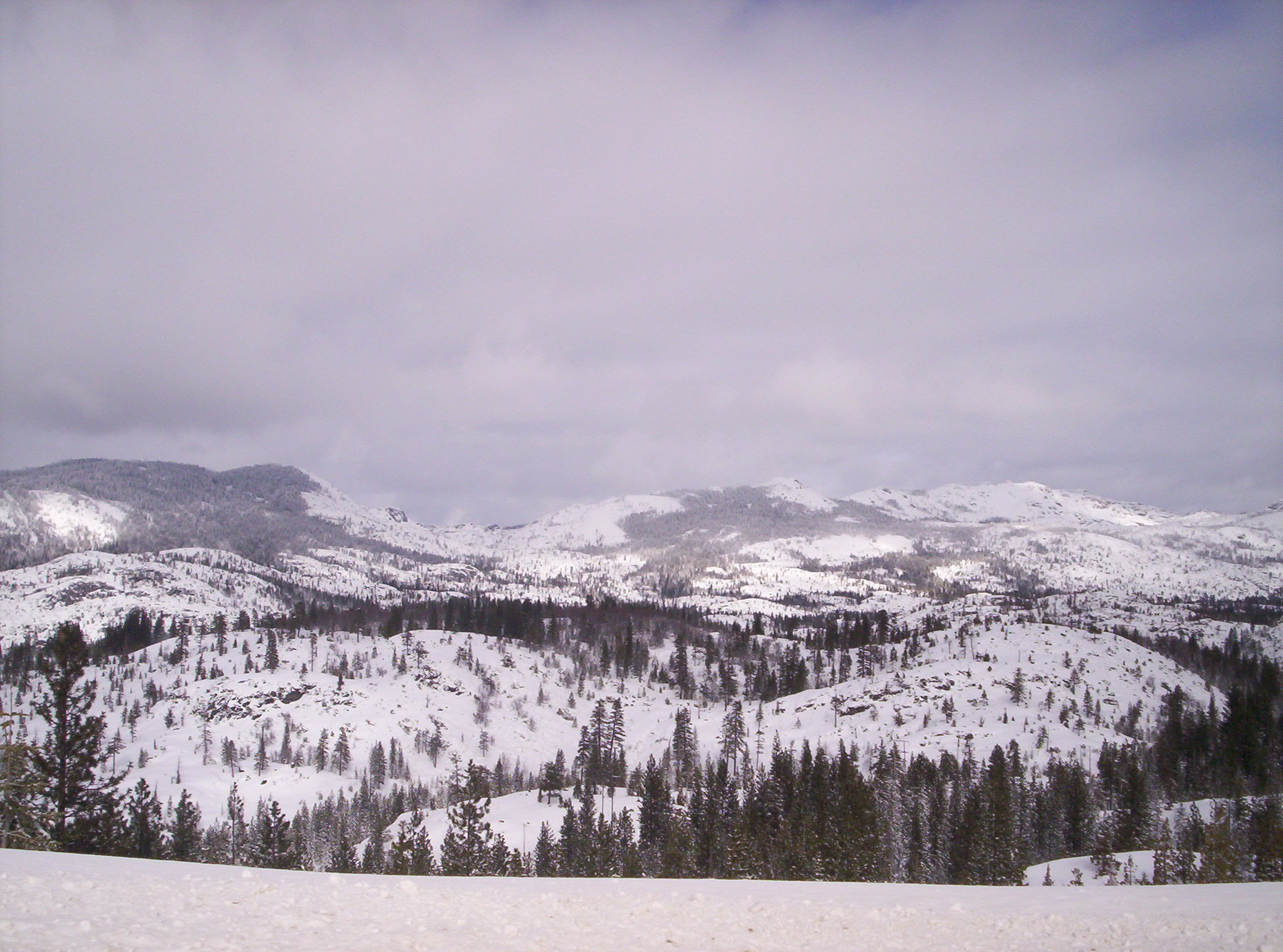
Basaseachic Falls National Park
Humid continental climate (Dfa)

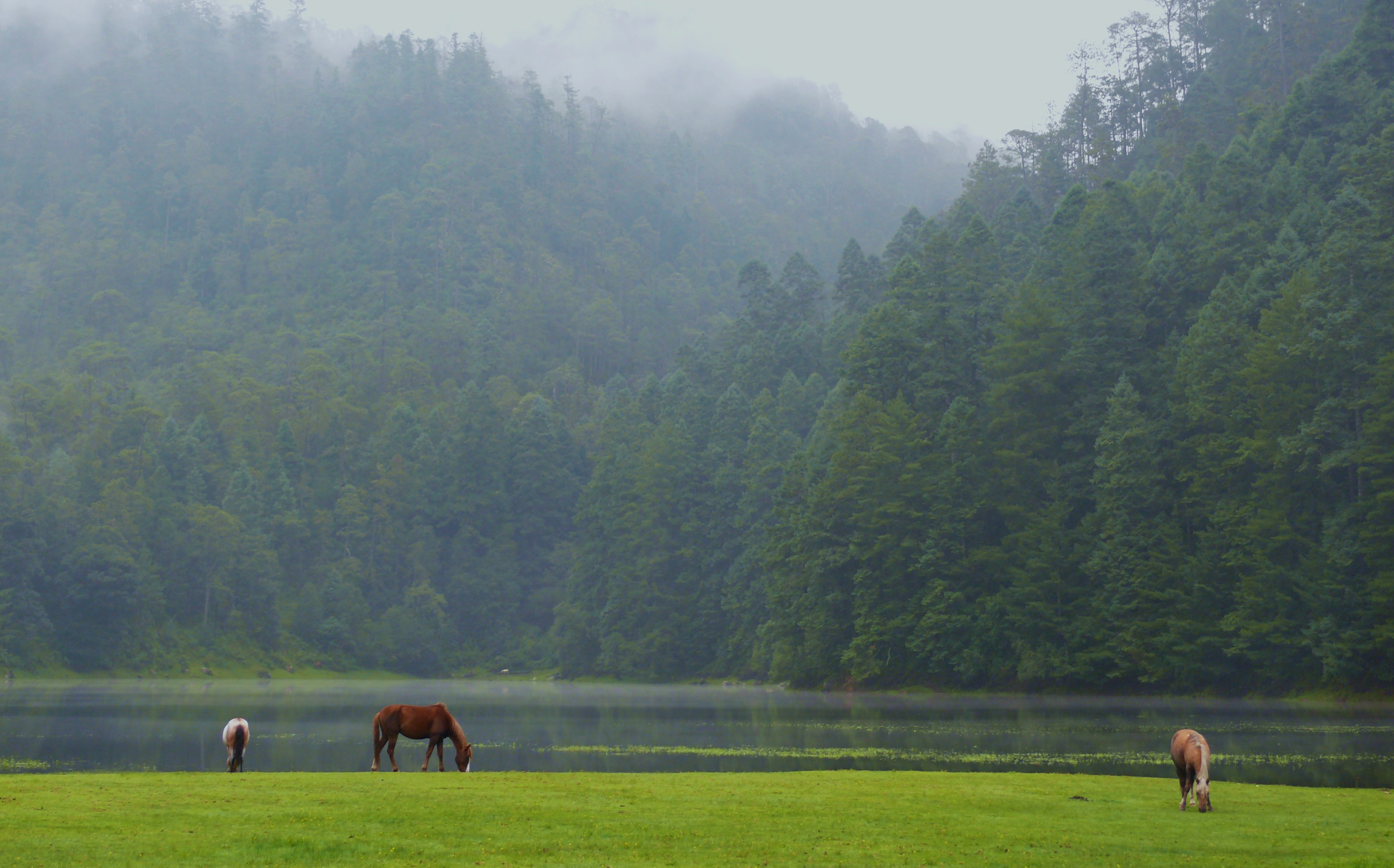
Lagunas de Zempoala
Highland oceanic climate (Cwb)

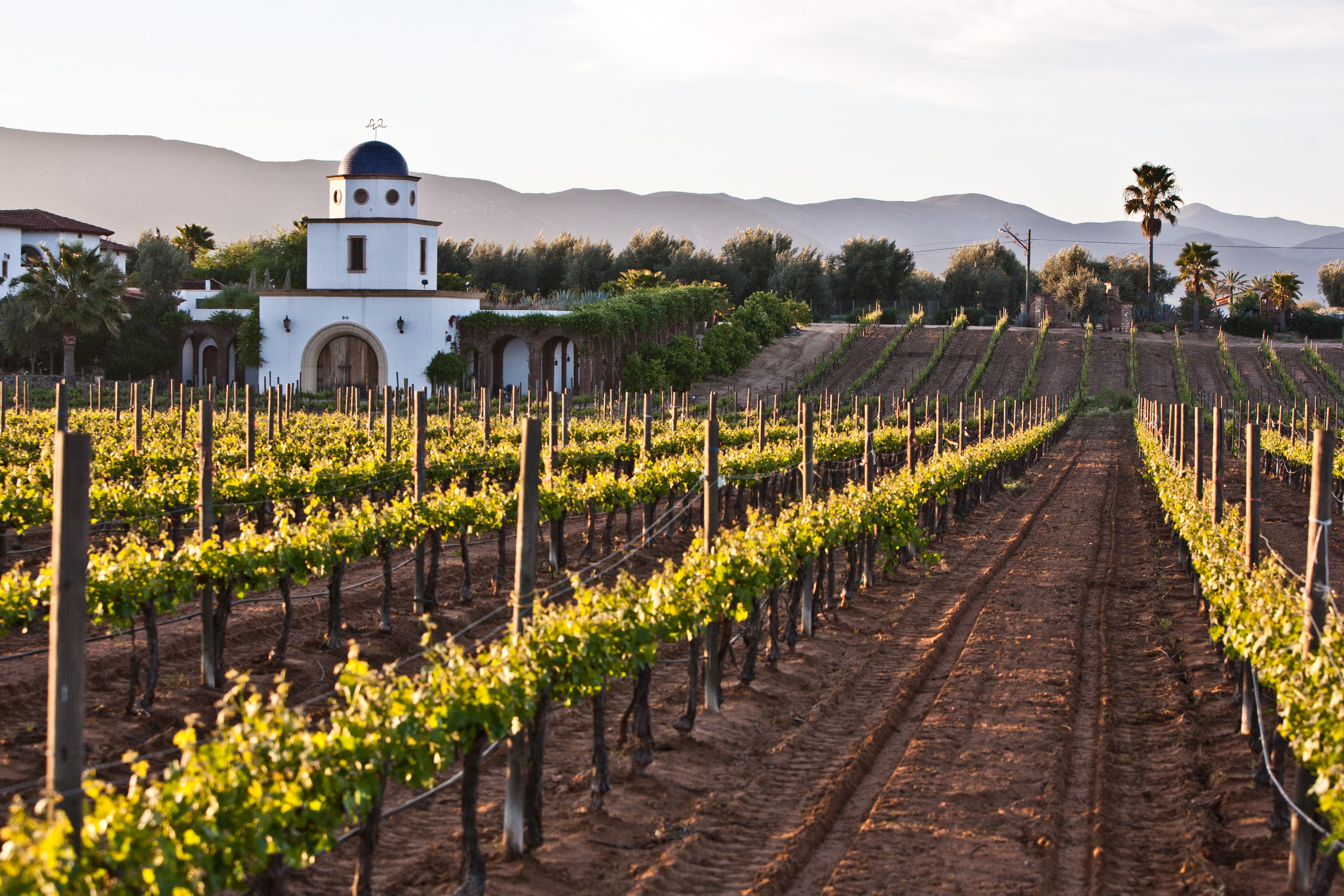
Valle de Guadalupe
Hot-summer mediterranean climate (Csa)

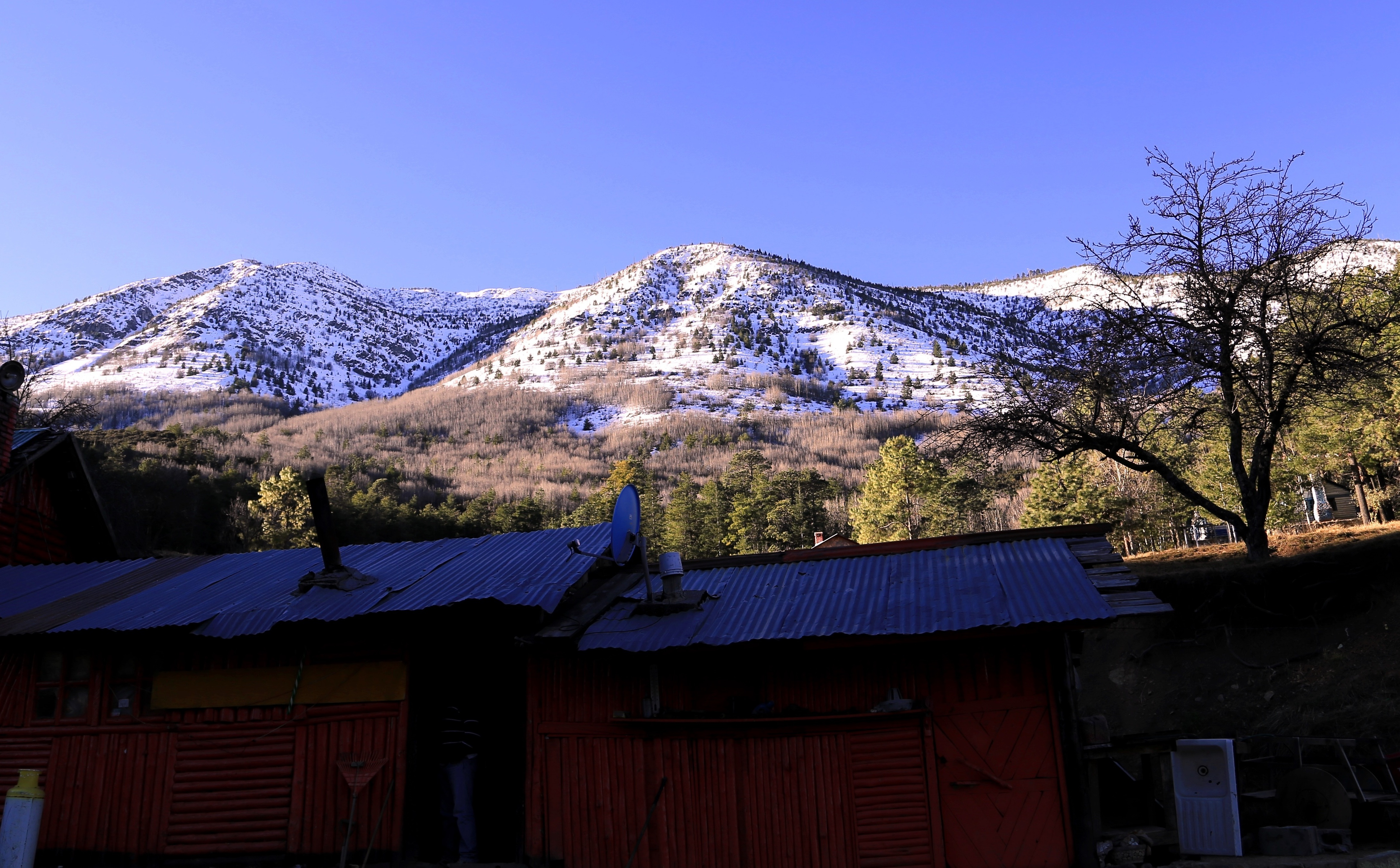
Sierra de Arteaga
Subpolar oceanic climate (Cwc)

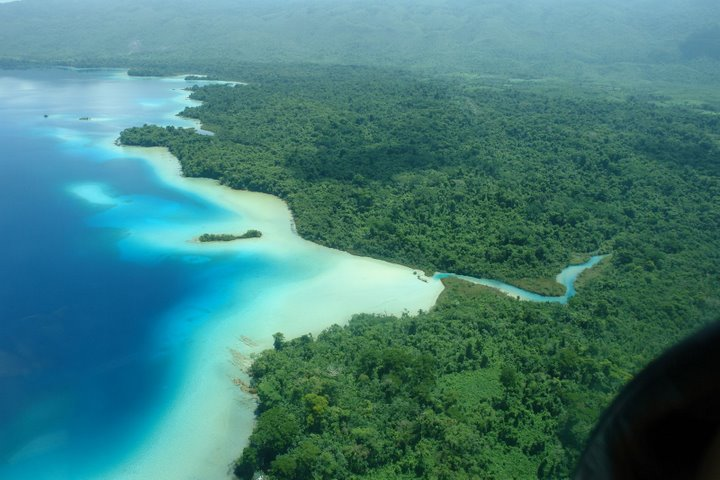
Selva Lacandona
Tropical rainforest climate (Af)

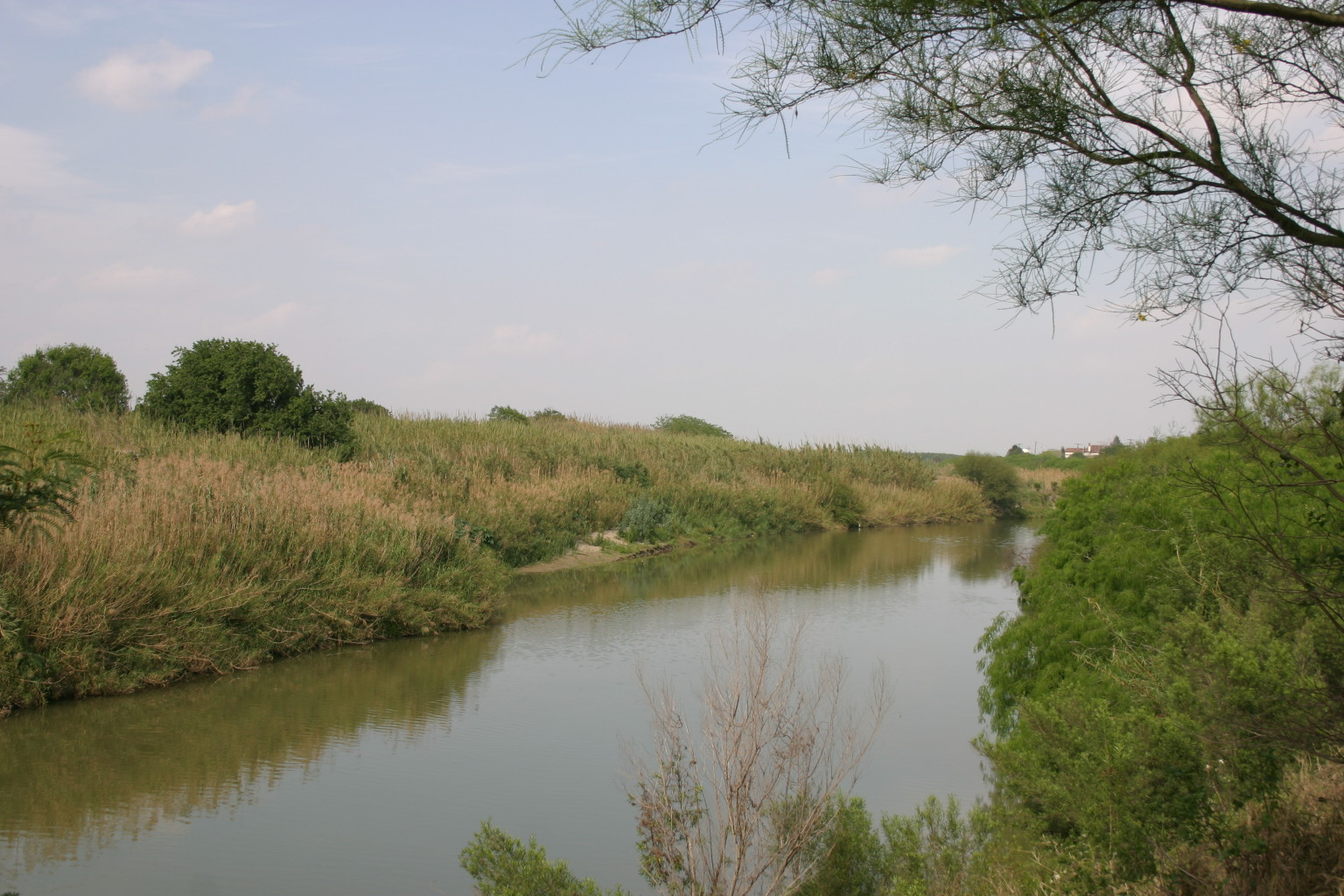
Río Bravo del Norte
Humid subtropical climate without dry season (Cfa)

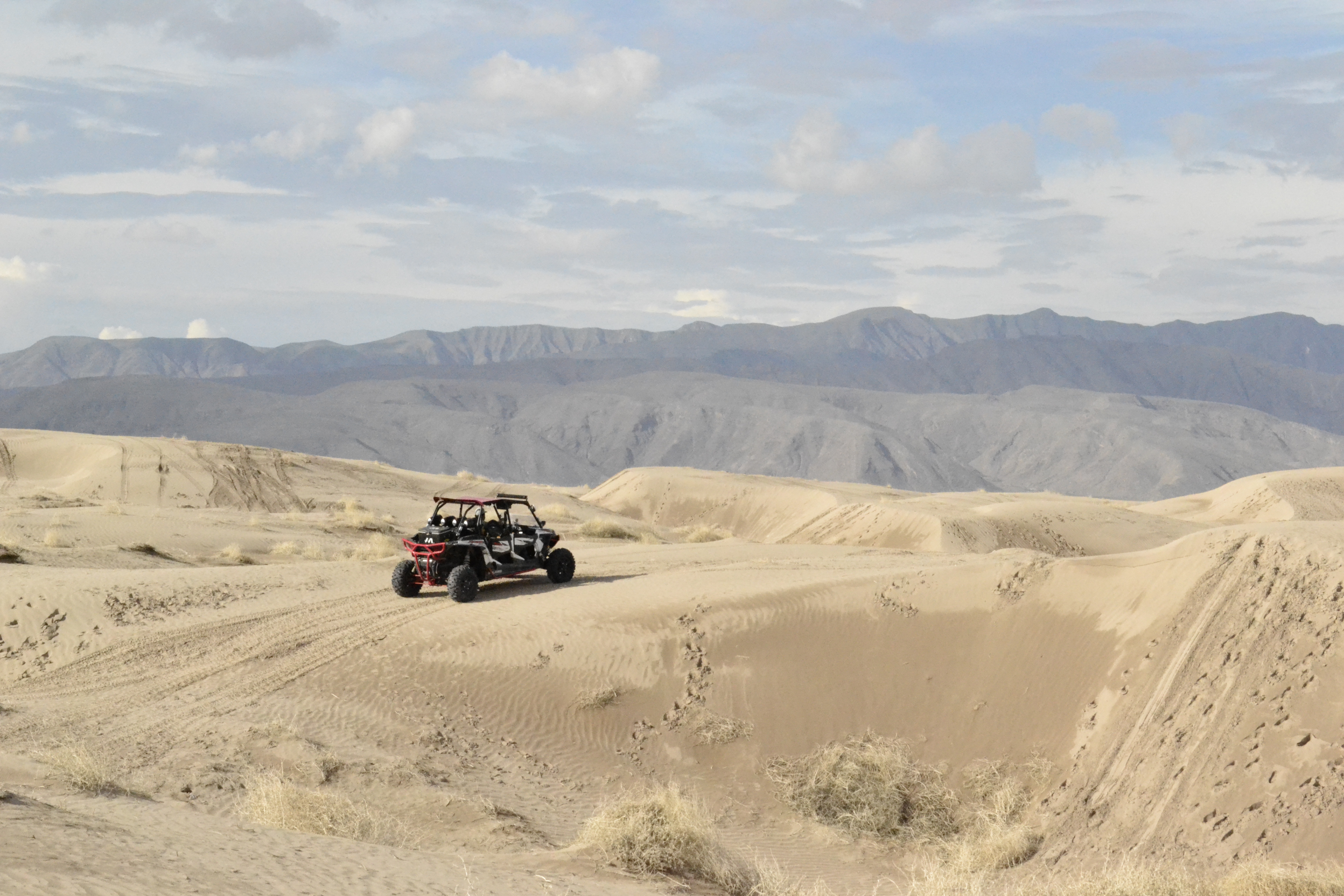
Dunas del Bilbao
Hot arid climate (BWh)

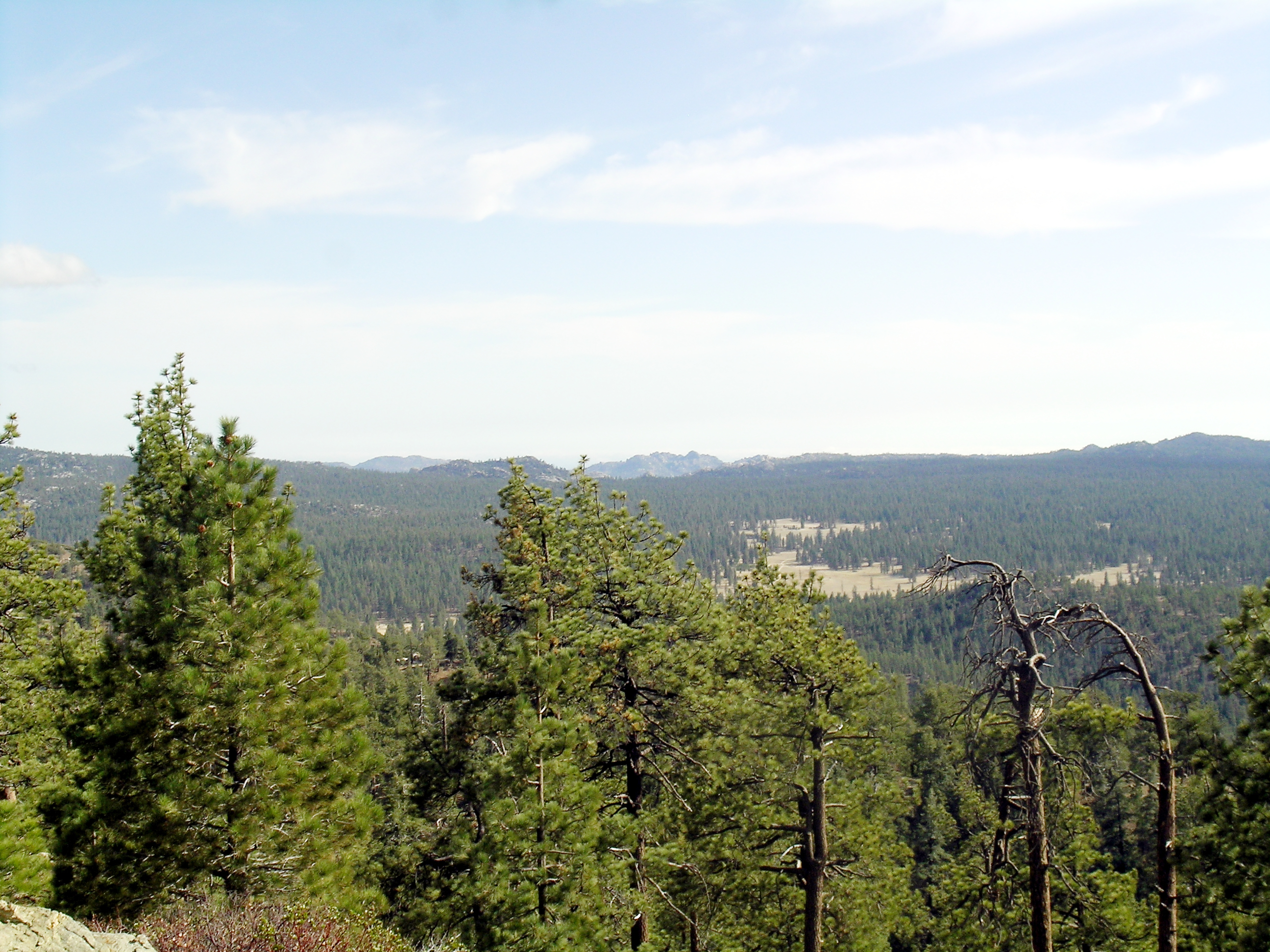
San Pedro Mártir National Park
Warm-summer mediterranean climate (Csb)

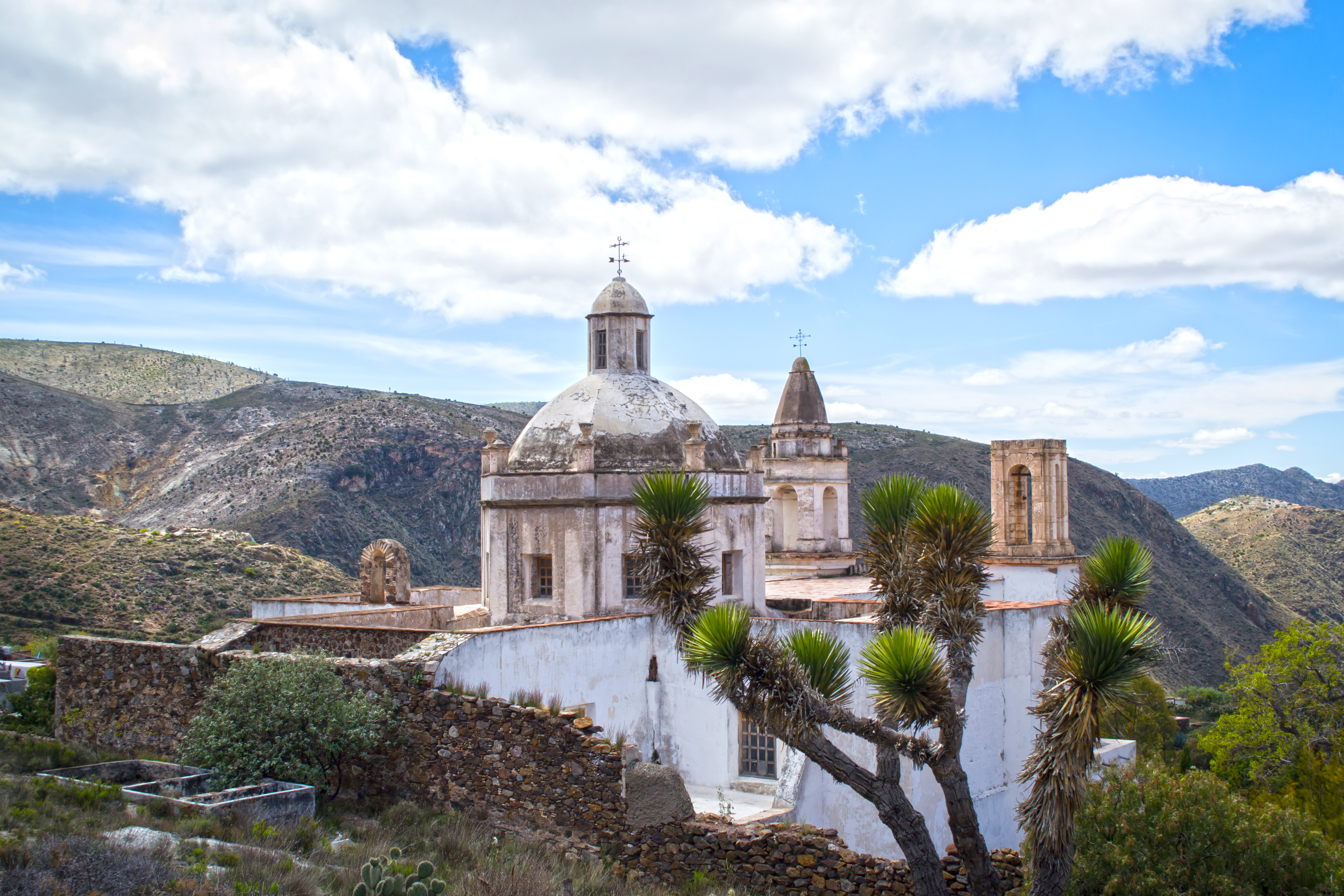
Real de Catorce
Cold arid climate (BWk)

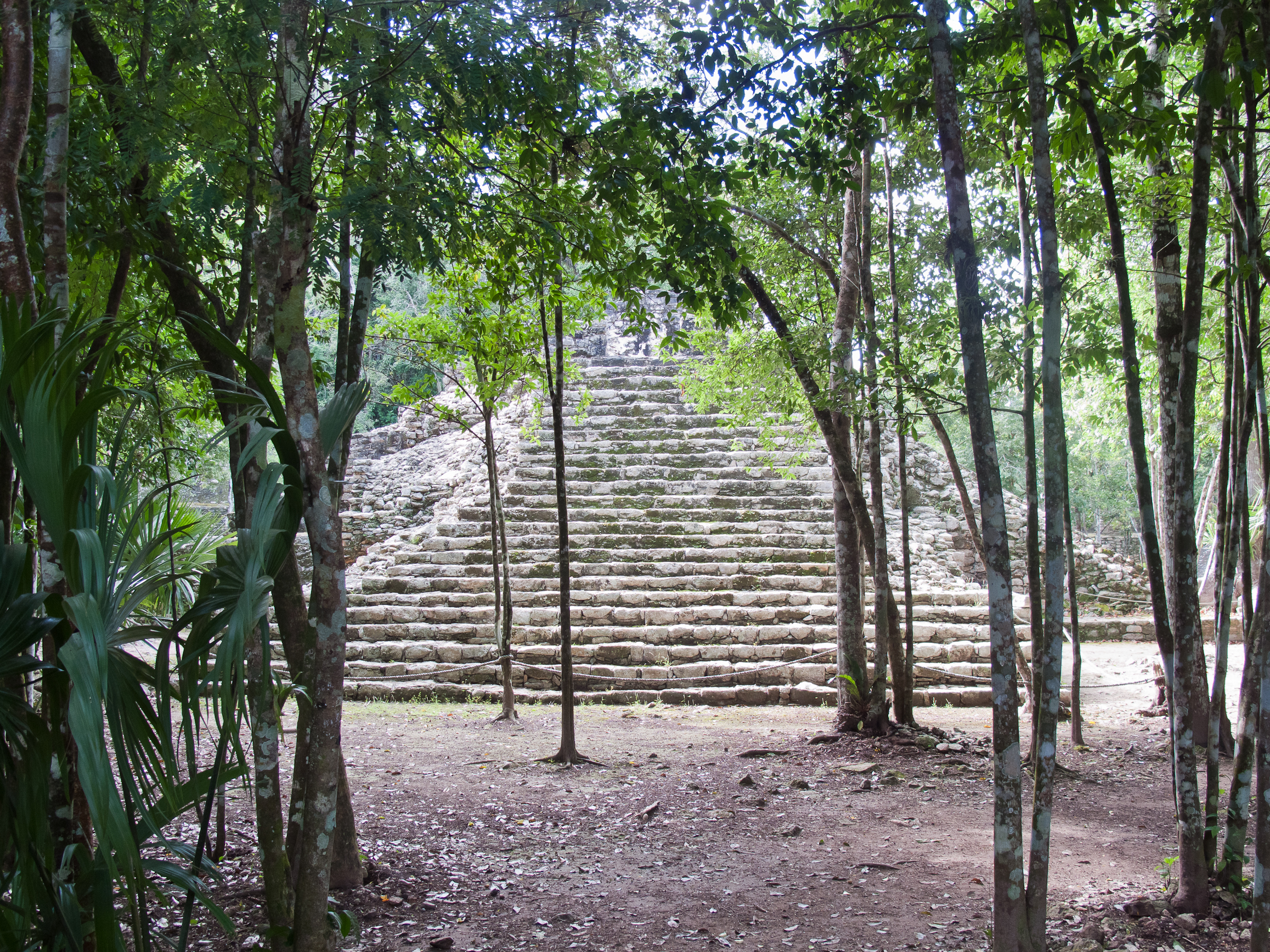
Cobá
Tropical savanna climate (Aw)

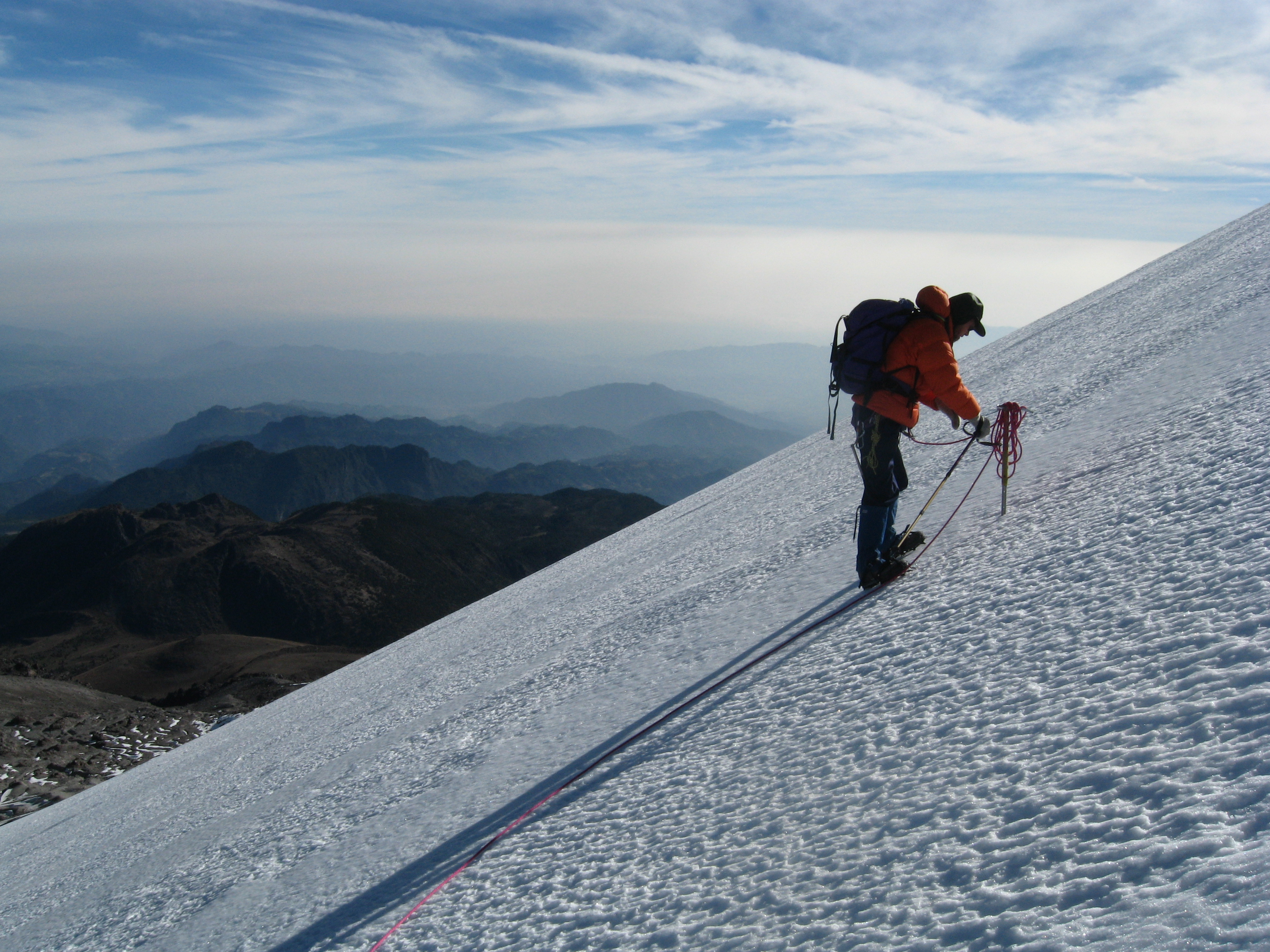
Pico de Orizaba
Ice Cap climate (EF)

== Weather records ==
Temperature

- Heat: 52.5 °C (126.5 °F) in San Luis Río Colorado, Sonora on 15 June 1966
- Cold: −29 °C (−20.2 °F) in Los Lamentos, Chihuahua on 11 January 1962

Precipitation

- Western Hemisphere record for 24-hour rainfall: 1633.98 mm (64.33 inches) over the time period of 12:30 UTC on 21 October 2005 to 12:30 UTC 22 October 2005 on Isla Mujeres, Quintana Roo during the passage of Hurricane Wilma. Also the record for the Northern Hemisphere.

== Climate change ==
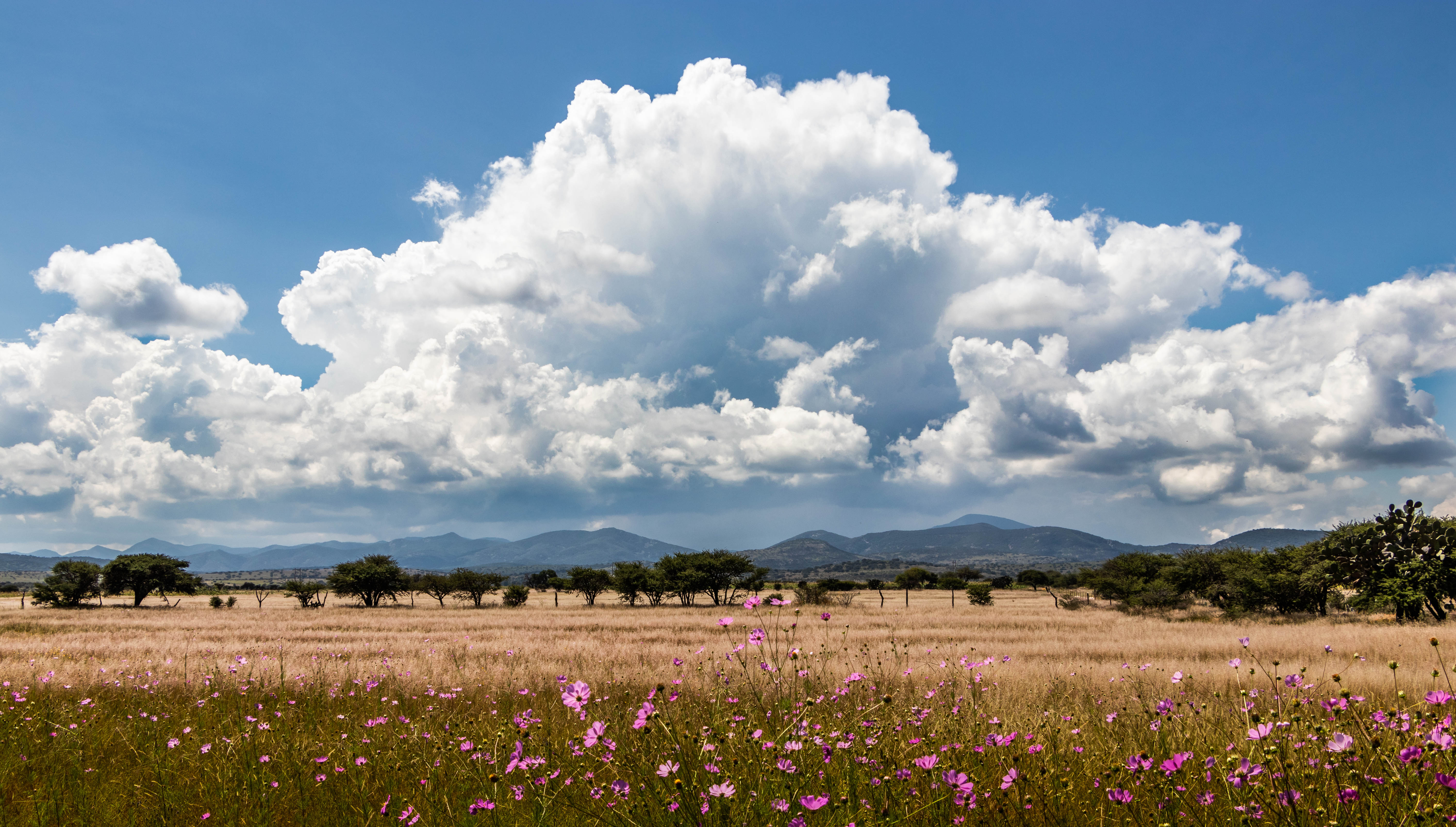
Large cloud over Mexican landscape.

Climate change in Mexico is causing widespread, possibly irreversible impacts including rising temperatures, altered precipitation patterns, drought, intensified hurricanes, and sea-level rise in coastal regions. These changes pose threats to water resources and agriculture, with rural communities and smallholder farmers relying on rain-fed agriculture being particularly vulnerable, and affecting crops including maize and coffee, contributing to economic insecurity. Climate change is impacting Mexican's health and exacerbating human migration. Climate change is increasing extinction risk for Mexico's biodiversity, with nearly 500 species listed as critically endangered.

In 2012, Mexico became the first major oil-producing emerging economy to enact climate legislation. Since then, Mexico has significantly increased its renewable electricity generation from wind and solar sources, however it is still dependent on fossil fuels for the majority of its energy. In 2023, Mexico was in the top 15 highest greenhouse gas emitters, contributing over 5 million tonnes, or 1.4% of the global total.

== See also ==
- Climate change in Mexico
- Geography of Mexico
