= Diocese of Cuernavaca =

Diocese of Cuernavaca may refer to:

- the Anglican Church of Mexico Diocese of Cuernavaca (Episcopal Church (USA), 1988–1995; IAM, 1995–present)
- the Roman Catholic Diocese of Cuernavaca (1891–present)
