= Sergio Méndez Arceo =

Mexican Catholic bishop (1907–1992)

Bishop Sergio Méndez Arceo
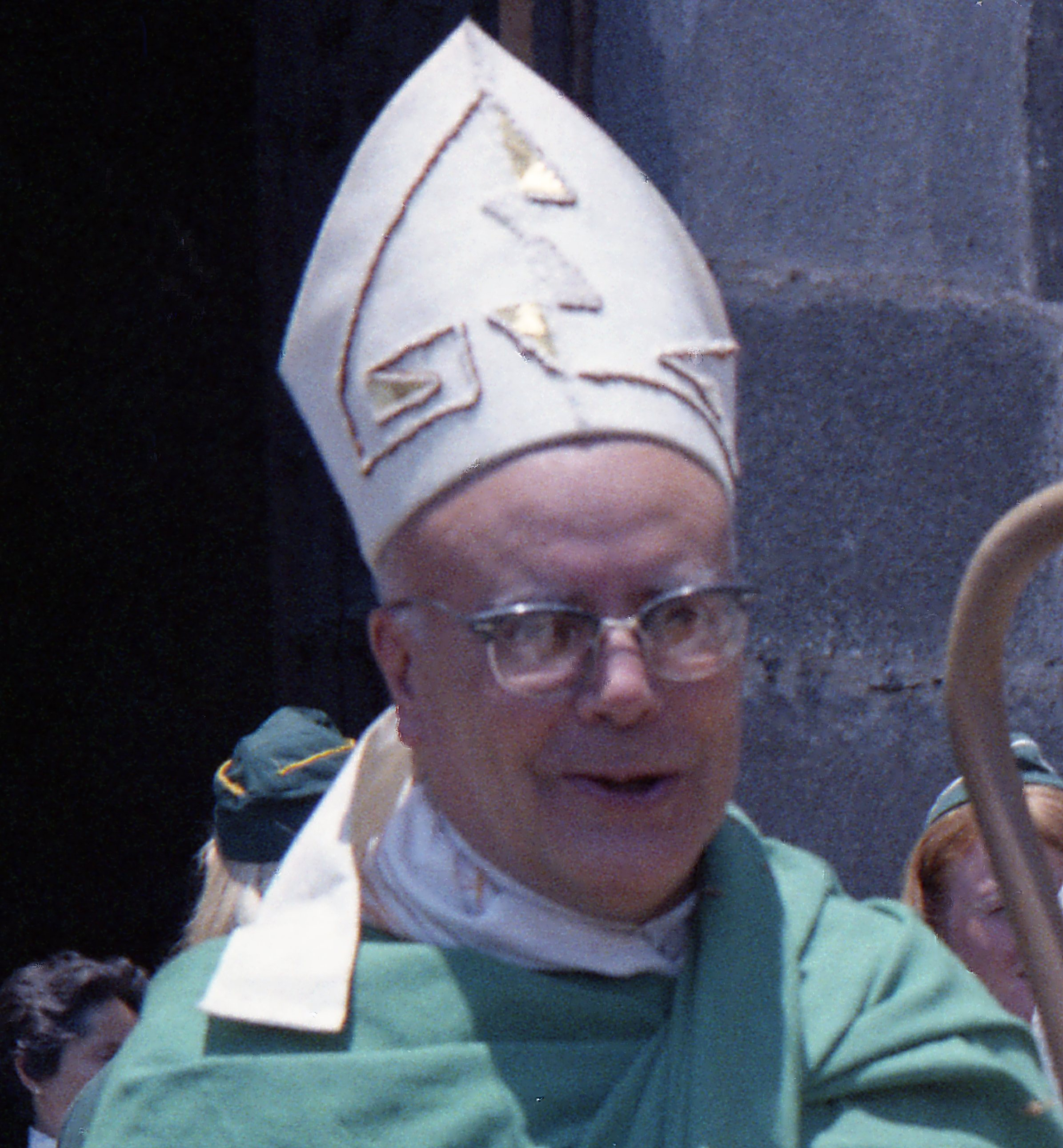
- Bishop, activist
- Diocese: Cuernavaca
- Appointed: 1953
- Retired: 1983
- Predecessor: Alfonso Espino y Silva
- Successor: Juan Jesús Posadas Ocampo
- Other post: Seminary professor

Orders
- Consecration: 1953

Personal details
- Born: Tlalpan, Mexico
- Died: February 5, 1992 (aged 84) Morelos, Mexico
- Denomination: Catholic
- Education: Pontifical Gregorian University

Sergio Méndez Arceo (28 October 1907, Tlalpan, Mexico City – 5 February 1992, Morelos, Cuernavaca) was a Mexican Roman Catholic bishop and activist. A product of a wealthy family, Méndez Arceo's father was a successful lawyer and his uncle was a prominent archbishop believed to be involved in the church-state conflict of the 1920s. Méndez Arceo graduated from the Pontifical Gregorian University of Rome and served as a seminary professor in Mexico. He became Roman Catholic Bishop of Cuernavaca, Morelos, in 1953 and served in that capacity until 1983. He was a progenitor of Latin American liberation theology.

== Early life and ecclesiastical studies ==
Sergio Méndez Arceo was born on the 28th of October, 1907 in Tlalpan, Mexico City. He was the youngest of 12 siblings, and was the child of David Méndez Rodriguez and Dolores Arceo Ramírez, two prominent liberals from Michoacan and relatives of Lazaro Cardenas.

On 1921, at the age of 14, Méndez Arceo, after listening to his uncle, archbishop Jose Mora y del Rio lament about the shortage of priests and the spread of protestantism in Mexico, would become convinced to join the catholic clergy. Nevertheless, his father would disapprove of this, with him going as far as to tell him: “I just want you to know one thing, son: there is no worse politics than that of the black cassock."

Still, Méndez Arceo, would go on to study Latin and philosophy courses at the Mexican Conciliar Seminary and would later receive an ecclesiastical education at the Pontifical Latin American College in Rome. By 1934, at the age of 27, Méndez Arceo would be ordained priest, and would continue studying in Rome until he earned a history doctorate from the Pontifical Latin American College, specializing in the bishoprics of Mexico during the 16th century.

== Ordination as bishop of Cuernavaca ==
After his studies in Rome, Méndez Arceo would return to Mexico City, where archbishop Luis Maria Martínez would assign him a parish in the historical center of the city. Shortly thereafter, Méndez Arceo began teaching at a minor seminary, and in 1945, he would become a professor of Latin, Greek, and history in a seminary.

In 1952, Sergio Méndez Arceo was ordained as bishop of the diocese of Cuernavaca. Altough at first Méndez Arceo was notorious for his traditionally conservative views, when he came into contact with the liturgical practices—as well as with the promotion of the use of psychoanalytic therapy— at the benedictine monastery of Santa María de la Resurrección led by Gregorio Lemercier, he came to sympathize with these practices and even adopted some of their liturgical reforms himself, including celebrating mass facing the congregation rather than with his back to them, as was customary at the time, and the use of the Spanish language rather than the traditional Latin.

Shortly thereafter, Méndez Arceo decided to remodel the Cuernavaca Cathedral and would assign the project to friar Gabriel Chávez de la Mora. This decision proved controversial and drew criticism from conservative circles, as it called for the removal of both the side altars and the statues of the Virgin Mary and other saints, and for the addition of a suspended figure of the Risen Christ in the center of the cathedral. Nevertheless, despite the controversies, in 1959 these changes were carried out and the cathedral was reinagurated later that same year.

== Basic ecclesial communities ==
Sergio Méndez Arceo was Bishop of the Cuernavaca diocese in the Mexican state of Morelos. He is often cited as the force behind the growth of basic ecclesial communities (Spanish: Comunidades Eclesiales de Base) (CEB) in Mexico during the 1970s. The first groups arose in Mexico in 1967 under Méndez Arceo, and by the 1970s CEBs were operating throughout Mexico, 70% in rural regions with the remainder in working-class urban areas. Méndez Arceo and the CEB's often removed the emphasis on the church's hierarchy, instead pushing for a greater dialogue between church leaders, non-clergy members and the members of the surrounding community. Members of the CEB's would meet with priests and discuss social, political and economic issues they felt needed attention. Following the meetings, priests would confer with Méndez Arceo weekly to discuss possible solutions to the issues of the members of the community. The growth of CEBs in Mexico is often cited as a reason for Cuernavaca being the focal point of renovation in the church. Méndez Arceo is quoted as saying;

"I can assure you that all my actions have been motivated by the conviction that I cannot abandon my fellow man, my brothers, that I must bear witness to the fact that a true Christian has the obligation to condemn any form of injustice, particularly the sort of injustice which becomes a veritable institution, the prevailing order of things"

== CIDOC ==
Méndez Arceo supported Ivan Illich, an Austrian philosopher of Croatian and Jewish origin, in setting up the Intercultural Documentation Center (Spanish: Centro Intercultural de Documentación) (CIDOC) at his diocese in Cuernavaca in 1961. Illich is stated as having pronounced to Méndez Arceo; "I would like to start, under your auspices, a center for de-Yankeefication." The Center was a research center and offered language courses to missionaries from North America and to volunteers of the Alliance for Progress program. Illich however was stated as having the goal of countering the participation of the Vatican in the "modern development" of the Third World. He believed that the Church should view itself as guest of the host country and, through the center, relayed this belief. The conservative members of the Church denounced the school, and for a time forbade clergy from studying at the location. The ban however was altered following Méndez Arceo's trip to Rome where he pleaded the case for the CIDOC. It was decided that priests and nuns may study at the CIDOC as long as their superiors monitored their progress.

== Liberation theology ==
During the Second Vatican Council, he formally requested the Supreme Pontiff to lift the excommunication for Freemasons.

Méndez Arceo was a believer in liberation theology, a belief which led him to be named the "Red Bishop" and a "scandalous supporter of socialism". In 1970 Méndez Arceo stated "Christianity and socialism can co-exist" and he encouraged then president of Mexico Luis Echeverría to form a committee of notable citizens to examine Mexico's most serious social and economic problems. Echeverría viewed Arceo as the foremost proponent of liberation theology and favored his emphasis on redistribution of wealth to the poor. Echeverría believed the clergy could help the people of Mexico learn the best means of organizing themselves in a capitalist society. The means of organizing in Arceo's view was labor unions, which he viewed as "essential to the base of community organizing." For the workers whom Arceo provided support for in his Sunday homilies, his title was Don Sergio, an honorific title in the Spanish language.

In April 1972, Méndez Arceo attended the Christians for Socialism conference in Santiago de Chile; he was the only member of the Mexican episcopate to attend. The conference was the first continent-wide gathering of its kind, composed of Catholics and Protestants. It is stated the conference members were composed of the most radical of those involved in liberal theology and that they attempted to find a synthesis between Christianity and socialism. The gathering was soon after banned by the Chilean episcopate.

Upon his retirement Méndez Arceo founded the Center for Meetings and Dialogue (CED) in Cuernavaca to serve as an umbrella organization for other social and activist programs in the state of Morelos. The role of the CED was to help assist in the continuation of his life work in the field of liberation theology. Today, the CED "provides a regional mechanism for progressive popular organizations" as well as housing statewide meetings in various fields such as women's empowerment, human rights, education, and environmental protection.

== Activism ==
Sergio Méndez Arceo was an advocate of the "spirit of Vatican II", which in his view moved for changes in ritual distribution of the sacraments, deemphasis on saints, more studying of the bible, and sociological studies to aid ecclesiastical organization. Méndez Arceo attempted unsuccessfully to have the Mexican Conference of Bishops explore the violent suppression of the student movements in 1968, known as Mexico 68. As an individual without the support of the other bishops, Méndez Arceo assisted the imprisoned students, often called political prisoners, following the Tlatelolco Plaza massacre. In January 1970 he informed his fellow bishops of the condition of those prisoners; the bishops made no references to the massacre itself or the outcome, in keeping with its nonconfrontational stance toward the government at the time. Méndez Arceo was also involved in other social movements in Mexico such as striking Cuernavaca workers and guerrillas from Guerrero. The inaction by the episcopate, against what was viewed as rampant social repression, is believed to be what sparked many individual clergy and Jesuits, and the episcopate's social secretariat, to shift its emphasis from schools for the elite to social action programs.

Méndez Arceo visited Cuba where he received the Orden de la Solidaridad from Fidel Castro for his "merit in the struggle against imperialism, colonialism, neocolonialism and other forms of exploitation." Following Méndez Arceo's trip to Cuba, he began supporting "democratic socialism."

== Retirement and death ==
On 1982, upon reaching the age of 75, Méndez Arceo would, as required by the Canon Law, submit his resignation as Bishop of Cuernavaca to Pope John Paul II. His resignation would be inmediately accepted upon that very same day.

Méndez Arceo would be succeeded by bishop Juan Jesús Posadas Ocampo. Over the course of the next two months, Pope John Paull II would appoint unsympathethic bishops who were not particularly aligned with Méndez Arceo's work. In the years that followed, these bishops would reverse most of Méndez Arceo's apostolic efforts.

On February 6th, 1992, Méndez Arceo would die at the age 84 in the city of Cuernavaca, Morelos. He was buried in the Cuernavaca Cathedral that very same day, amidst calls of parishioners that chanted: "we want more bishops that stand up for the poor."

== Impact ==
Soon after his death, in 1992, the Natonal Don Sergio Méndez Arceo Award for Human Rights was established in Mexico with the goal of "recognizing organizations and activists who fight for peace, the self-determination of peoples, and respect for human rights."

== Criticism ==
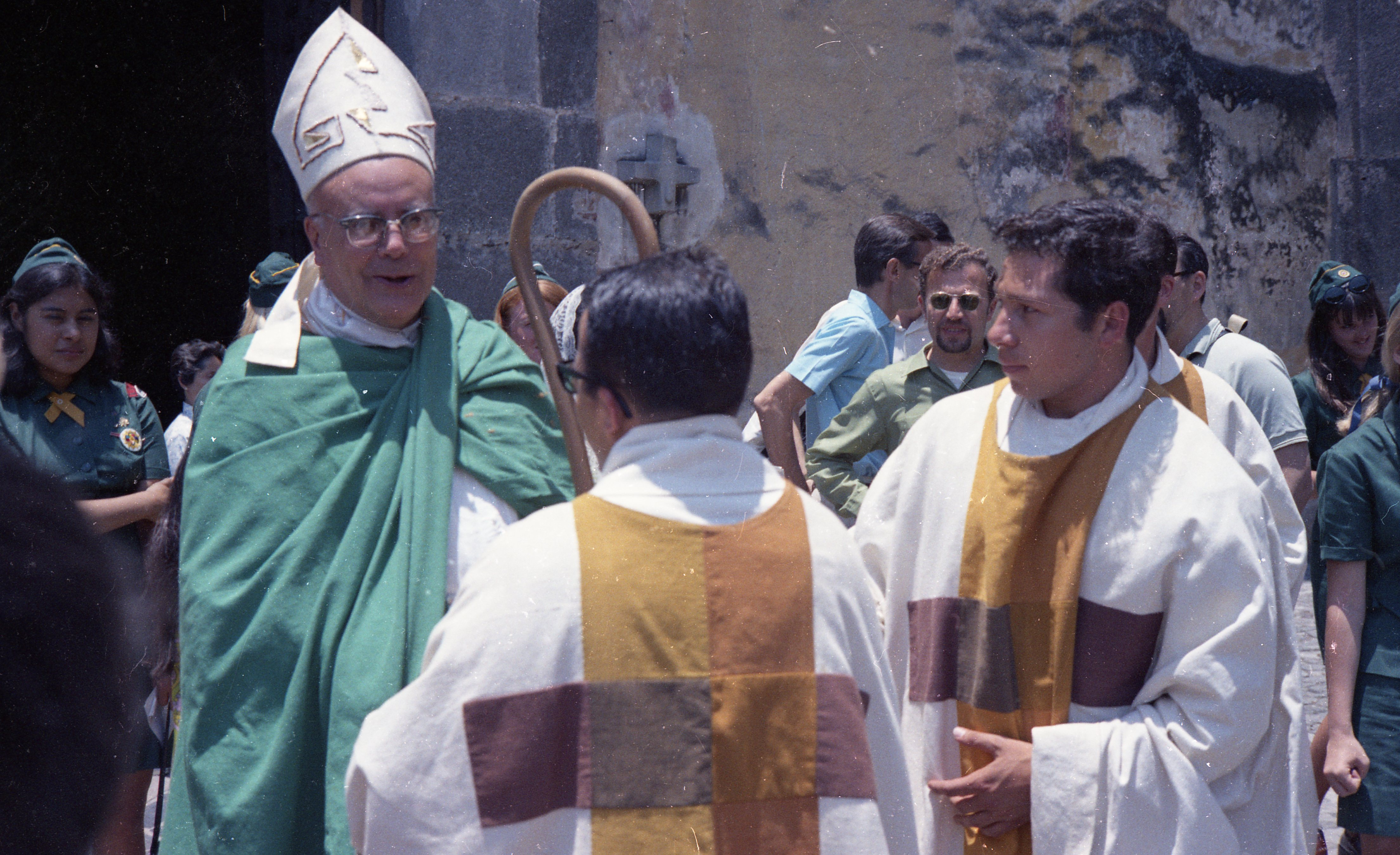
Sergio Méndez Arceo, bishop of Cuernavaca, exiting his cathedral in 1970

Some say that Sergio Méndez Arceo's actions and views made him too controversial, to the point that it limited his ability to form collegiality with other Mexican bishops and the episcopate; also that he politicized his diocese and its communities, and in doing so was opposed to the government. Roderic Ai Camp in Crossing Swords: Politics and Religion in Mexico states that this is wrong, and asserts "empirical data ... states that religion in Cuernavaca is associated with increased PRI support." The Institutional Revolutionary Party (Spanish: Partido Revolucionario Institucional) (PRI), being the then ruling party.

It later become known that the United States Federal Bureau of Investigation (FBI) produced a report on Méndez Arceo stating he was friendly to the Farabundo Martí National Liberation Front (Spanish: Frente Farabundo Martí para la Liberación Nacional) (FMLN) of El Salvador and the Sandinista National Liberation Front (Spanish: Frente Sandinista de Liberación Nacional)(FSLN) of Nicaragua, which took power in 1979 following the collapse of the Somoza regime. The FBI further alleged Méndez Arceo's diocese collected intelligence, bought and sold guns, and served as couriers for communist guerrillas of El Salvador. Méndez Arceo was further accused of being contacted by the Soviet Union Committee for State Security (Russian: Komityet Gosudarstvennoy Bezopasnosti) (KGB) and Cuban General Intelligence Directorate (Spanish: Dirección General de Inteligencia) (DGI).

In an article in the Catholic periodical The Athanasian, it is claimed that Arceo was "in fact a crypto-Freemason"; and that "there were and are many more like him in the Vatican hierarchy".

== Documentary ==
In 2024, a feature-length documentary titled Red Bishop (Spanish: Obispo Rojo) directed by Francesco Taboada Tabone was premiered on The 78th International Film Exhibition at Mexico City's National Film Archive. The documentary portrays the life of Sergio Méndez Arceo and includes both unreleased material and interviews with multiple relevant figures in liberation theology, including Leonardo Boff, Enrique Dussel, and Gabriel Chávez de la Mora.

The documentary later had a commercial release in Mexican cinemas on April 9, 2026.

== See also ==
- List of people from Morelos
