= Maximino Martínez Miranda =

Mexican Roman Catholic bishop (born 1951)

The Most Reverend Maximino Martínez Miranda
- Church: Catholic Church
- Archdiocese: Toluca
- Appointed: 28 October 2017
- Installed: 28 October 2017
- Term ended: 1 September 2026
- Previous post: Bishop of Ciudad Altamirano (2006–2017)

Orders
- Ordination: 21 September 1979 by Arturo Vélez Martínez
- Consecration: 31 August 2006 by Giuseppe Bertello

Personal details
- Born: 29 May 1951 (age 75) Palos Altos, Soyaniquilpan de Juárez, State of Mexico, Mexico

Maximino Martínez Miranda (born 29 May 1951) is a Mexican Roman Catholic prelate who served as Bishop of Ciudad Altamirano from 2006 to 2017 and as auxiliary bishop of Toluca from 2017 to 2026. He was also titular bishop of Lugura. Pope Benedict XVI appointed him Bishop of Ciudad Altamirano on 7 July 2006, and he was consecrated on 31 August 2006. Pope Francis appointed him Auxiliary Bishop of Toluca and Titular Bishop of Lugura on 28 October 2017. On 1 September 2026, Pope Francis accepted his resignation from the office of Auxiliary Bishop of the Archdiocese of Toluca.

== Early life and priesthood ==
Martínez Miranda was born on 29 May 1951 in Palos Altos, in the municipality of Soyaniquilpan de Juárez in the State of Mexico. He entered the Major Seminary of Toluca in 1968 and pursued his ecclesiastical studies there. He was ordained a priest on 21 September 1979.

Following the establishment of the Diocese of Atlacomulco, Martínez Miranda became incardinated in that diocese. As a priest, he served as cooperator vicar in Almoloya de Juárez and subsequently as parish priest in San Antonio la Isla and San Pedro el Alto. He later served as director of the magazine Ad gentes y sembradores, and as parish priest of Canalejas and El Oro. From 2000 to 2006 he was vicar general of the Diocese of Atlacomulco and parish priest of Santa María de Guadalupe. He also served as diocesan director of missions and communications and as spiritual director of pilgrimages.

The Archdiocese of Toluca records that Martínez Miranda was involved in a number of lay and pastoral movements, including Jornadas de Vida Cristiana, Liga Misional Juvenil, Horizontes para Adolescentes, Pandillas de Vida Cristiana, Encuentros Conyugales and Encuentros Matrimoniales. He also undertook an experience in communications ministry in Fresno, California, in 1986.

== Episcopate ==
=== Bishop of Ciudad Altamirano ===
On 7 July 2006, Pope Benedict XVI appointed Martínez Miranda Bishop of Ciudad Altamirano in the Mexican state of Guerrero. He was consecrated a bishop on 31 August 2006 at the Grand Seminary in Ciudad Altamirano. Giuseppe Bertello, then Apostolic Nuncio to Mexico, served as principal consecrator, with Francisco Javier Chavolla Ramos, Bishop of Toluca, and Constancio Miranda Weckmann, Bishop of Atlacomulco, as co-consecrators.

As Bishop of Ciudad Altamirano, Martínez Miranda served a diocese whose territory included communities in Guerrero as well as areas of the neighboring states of Mexico and Michoacán. During his episcopate, the region experienced severe insecurity and violence. In 2014, he said that Church representatives would not withdraw from the area despite the security situation and rejected the idea of abandoning the region, describing continued pastoral presence as a challenge to be undertaken as part of his mission.

=== Auxiliary Bishop of Toluca ===
On 28 October 2017, Pope Francis appointed Martínez Miranda Auxiliary Bishop of Toluca, transferring him from Ciudad Altamirano and assigning him the titular episcopal see of Lugura.

Martínez Miranda remained an auxiliary bishop of Toluca until his resignation was accepted by Pope Francis on 1 September 2026, in accordance with the provisions of canon law concerning the resignation of bishops. At the time of his resignation, he was Bishop of the titular see of Lugura.
