= Archdiocese of Toluca =

Roman Catholic archdiocese in Mexico

Coordinates: 19.2914°N 99.6572°W

Archdiocese of Toluca Archidioecesis Tolucensis Arquidiócesis de Toluca
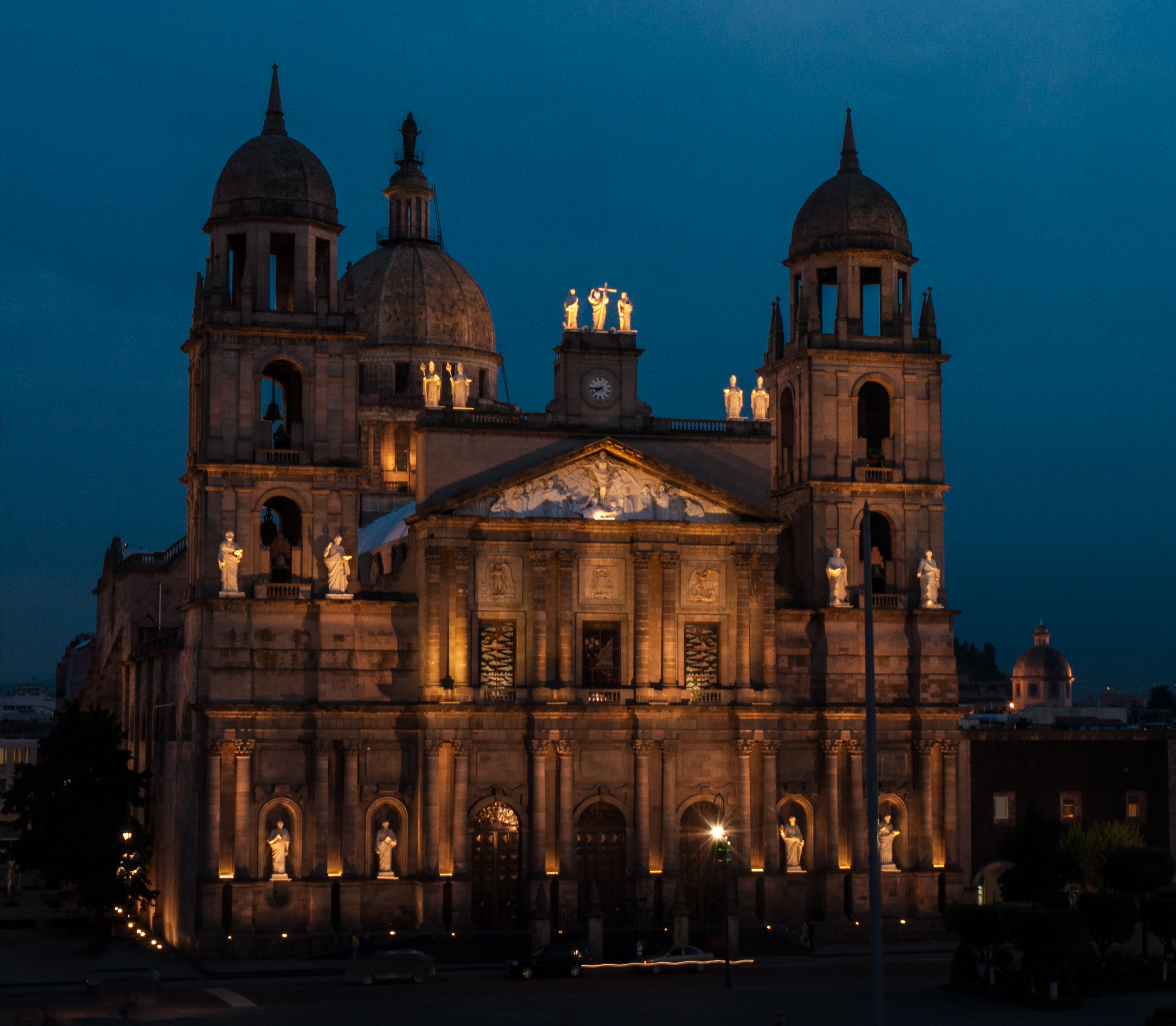
- Catedral de San José de Nazaret

Location
- Country: Mexico
- Metropolitan: Toluca

Statistics
- Area: 1,939 sq mi (5,020 km^{2})
- Population: Total; Catholics: (as of 2010); 3,318,000; 3,105,000 (93.6%)
- Parishes: 142

Information
- Denomination: Roman Catholic
- Rite: Roman Rite
- Established: 4 June 1950 (76 years ago)
- Cathedral: Cathedral of St. Joseph of Nazareth

Current leadership
- Pope: Leo XIV
- Archbishop: Raúl Gómez González
- Bishops emeritus: Francisco Javier Chavolla Ramos, Maximino Martínez Miranda

Map
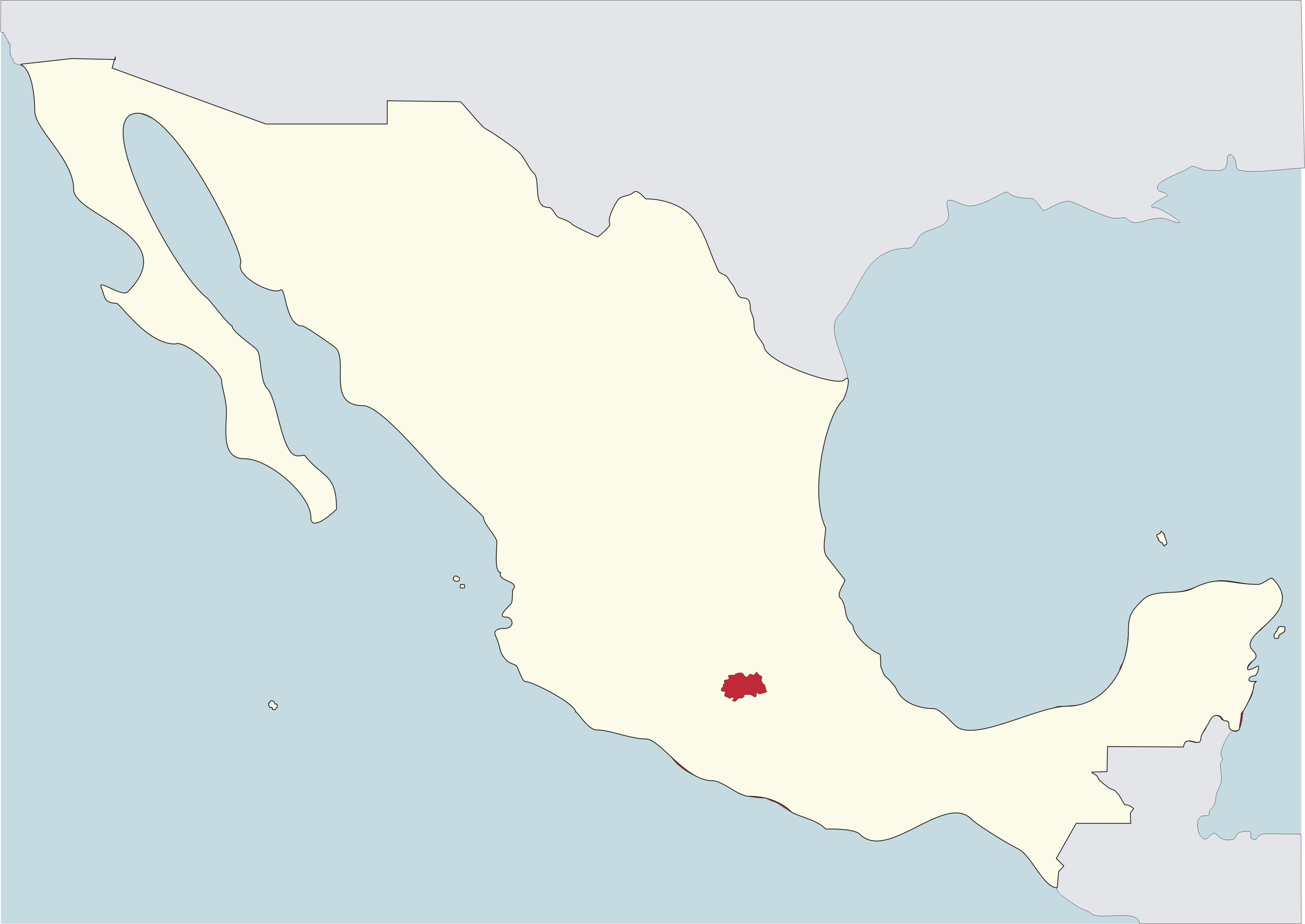

Website
- www.diocesistoluca.org.mx

The Roman Catholic Archdiocese of Toluca (Latin: Archidioecesis Tolucensis) (erected 4 June 1950 as a diocese and 28 September 2019 as an archdiocese) is a metropolitan archdiocese of the Catholic Church.

== History ==
The Archdiocese of Toluca was erected as a diocese on 4 June 1950 from the Archdiocese of México's territory. Rev. Arturo Vélez Martínez, who had been a priest in the Archdiocese of México, was appointed the first bishop of the new diocese and led it for almost three decades. In 1964, more territory of the Archdiocese of México (Acambay, Aculeo, Morelos, Polotitlan, Temascalcingo, and Timilpan) was added to the Diocese of Toluca.

Along with the Dioceses of Acapulco, Chilapa and Tacámbaro, the Diocese of Toluca lost territory when the Diocese of Ciudad Altamirano was erected in 1964. It further lost territory in 1984 with the formation of the Diocese of Atlacomulco. On 26 November 2009, it lost territory again when Pope Benedict XVI created another suffragan diocese for the Archdiocese of Mexico, the Diocese of Tenancingo.

On 28 September 2019, Pope Francis changed the status of the diocese to that of a metropolitan archdiocese and assigned to it three suffragan dioceses that until then were suffragans of the Archdiocese of Mexico: Atlacomulco, Tenancingo, and Cuernavaca.

Ecclesiastical province of Toluca
Cathedrals:
1 Toluca
2 Atlacomulco
3 Cuernavaca
4 Tenancingo

== Ordinaries ==
=== Bishops (1950–2019) ===
- Arturo Vélez Martínez (1951–1979)
- Alfredo Torres Romero (1980–1995)
- Francisco Robles Ortega (1996–2003) appointed Archbishop of Monterrey, Nuevo León; elevated to Cardinal in 2008
- Francisco Javier Chavolla Ramos (2003–2019) see below

=== Archbishops (from 2019) ===
- Francisco Javier Chavolla Ramos (2019–2022) see above
- Raúl Gómez González (2022–present)

=== Auxiliary bishop ===
- José Francisco Robles Ortega (1991–1996), appointed bishop here; later cardinal
- Maximino Martínez Miranda (2017–2026)

=== Other priests of this diocese who became bishops ===
- Felipe Arizmendi Esquivel, appointed Bishop of Tapachula, Chiapas in 1991, later cardinal
- José Miguel Ángel Giles Vázquez, appointed Bishop of Ciudad Altamirano, Guerrero in 2004
- Adolfo Miguel Castaño Fonseca, appointed Auxiliary Bishop of México, Federal District in 2010
- Juan Odilón Martínez García, appointed Bishop of Atlacomulco, México in 2010
- Luis Manuel López Alfaro (priest here, 1991–2004), appointed Auxiliary Bishop of San Cristóbal de Las Casas in 2020

== Episcopal See ==
- Toluca, State of México

== See also ==
- Catholic Church in Mexico

== External links and references ==
- "Diocese of Toluca". Catholic-Hierarchy.
