= Sabás Magaña García =

- Bishop of Matamoros
- Church: Catholic Church
- Diocese: Diocese of Matamoros
- In office: 30 December 1968 – 7 November 1990
- Predecessor: Estanislao Alcaraz y Figueroa
- Successor: Francisco Javier Chavolla Ramos

Orders
- Ordination: 23 September 1944
- Consecration: 6 January 1969 by Pope Paul VI

Personal details
- Born: 24 January 1921 Morelia, Michoacán, Mexico
- Died: 7 November 1990 (aged 69)

Sabás Magaña García (24 January 1921 in Morelia, Michoacán, Mexico – 7 November 1990) was the bishop of the diocese of Matamoros, chosen by Pope Paul VI on 30 December 1968, and receiving consecration in Rome on 6 January 1969. He served as bishop from 1969 until his death in 1990, being the second bishop of Matamoros.
