= Raúl Gómez González =

Mexican Roman Catholic archbishop (born 1954)

The Most Reverend Raúl Gómez González
- Archbishop of Toluca
- Church: Catholic Church
- Archdiocese: Toluca
- See: Toluca
- Appointed: 19 March 2022
- Installed: 19 May 2022
- Predecessor: Francisco Javier Chavolla Ramos
- Previous post: Bishop of Tenancingo (2010–2022)

Orders
- Ordination: 23 April 1983 by José López Lara
- Consecration: 25 January 2010 by Christophe Pierre

Personal details
- Born: 17 February 1954 (age 72) Capilla de Guadalupe, Jalisco, Mexico
- Parents: Andrés Gómez Barajas; Luz María González
- Education: Pontifical Alphonsian Academy
- Motto: In nomine Domini
- Coat of arms

Raúl Gómez González (born 17 February 1954) is a Mexican Roman Catholic prelate who has served as archbishop of Toluca since 2022. He previously served as the first bishop of Tenancingo from 2010 to 2022. He was appointed archbishop of Toluca by Pope Francis on 19 March 2022 and took canonical possession of the archdiocese on 19 May 2022.

== Early life and education ==
Gómez González was born in Capilla de Guadalupe, Jalisco, on 17 February 1954, to Andrés Gómez Barajas and Luz María González.

He began his studies at the Minor Seminary of Guadalajara and subsequently continued his formation at the diocesan seminary of San Juan de los Lagos, where he studied philosophy and theology. He was ordained a priest for the Diocese of San Juan de los Lagos on 23 April 1983.

From 1984 to 1986, Gómez González was sent to Rome for further studies. He studied sacred music and moral theology and obtained a licentiate in moral theology from the Pontifical Alphonsian Academy.

== Priesthood ==
Following his ordination, Gómez González served in parish ministry in the Diocese of San Juan de los Lagos. He subsequently served as a parish priest, taught moral theology and music at the diocesan seminary, and held responsibilities relating to lay formation and liturgical music. He also served as director of the cathedral choir and diocesan music school.

In March 2004, he became parish priest of San Juan Bautista parish in San Juan de los Lagos. From 2008 he served as vicar general of the Diocese of San Juan de los Lagos.

== Episcopacy ==
=== Bishop of Tenancingo ===
On 26 November 2009, Pope Benedict XVI erected the Diocese of Tenancingo from territory previously belonging to the Diocese of Toluca and appointed Gómez González as its first bishop. At the time of his appointment, he was vicar general of the Diocese of San Juan de los Lagos.

He received his episcopal consecration on 25 January 2010. Christophe Pierre, then Apostolic Nuncio to Mexico, was the principal consecrator, with Norberto Rivera Carrera and José Francisco Robles Ortega serving as principal co-consecrators.

During his episcopate, Gómez González was involved in the pastoral and liturgical work of the Mexican Episcopal Conference. From 2018, he was responsible for the Episcopal dimension of liturgical music.

=== Archbishop of Toluca ===
On 19 March 2022, Pope Francis accepted the resignation of Francisco Javier Chavolla Ramos as archbishop of Toluca and appointed Gómez González as his successor. He thereby became the second metropolitan archbishop of Toluca. He took possession of the archdiocese on 19 May 2022.

On the Feast of Saints Peter and Paul in 2022, Gómez González was among the archbishops who received the pallium from Pope Francis in the Vatican.
