= Diocese of Matamoros–Reynosa =

Latin Catholic jurisdiction in Mexico

Diocese of Matamoros-Reynosa Dioecesis Matamorensis Diócesis de Matamoros-Reynosa
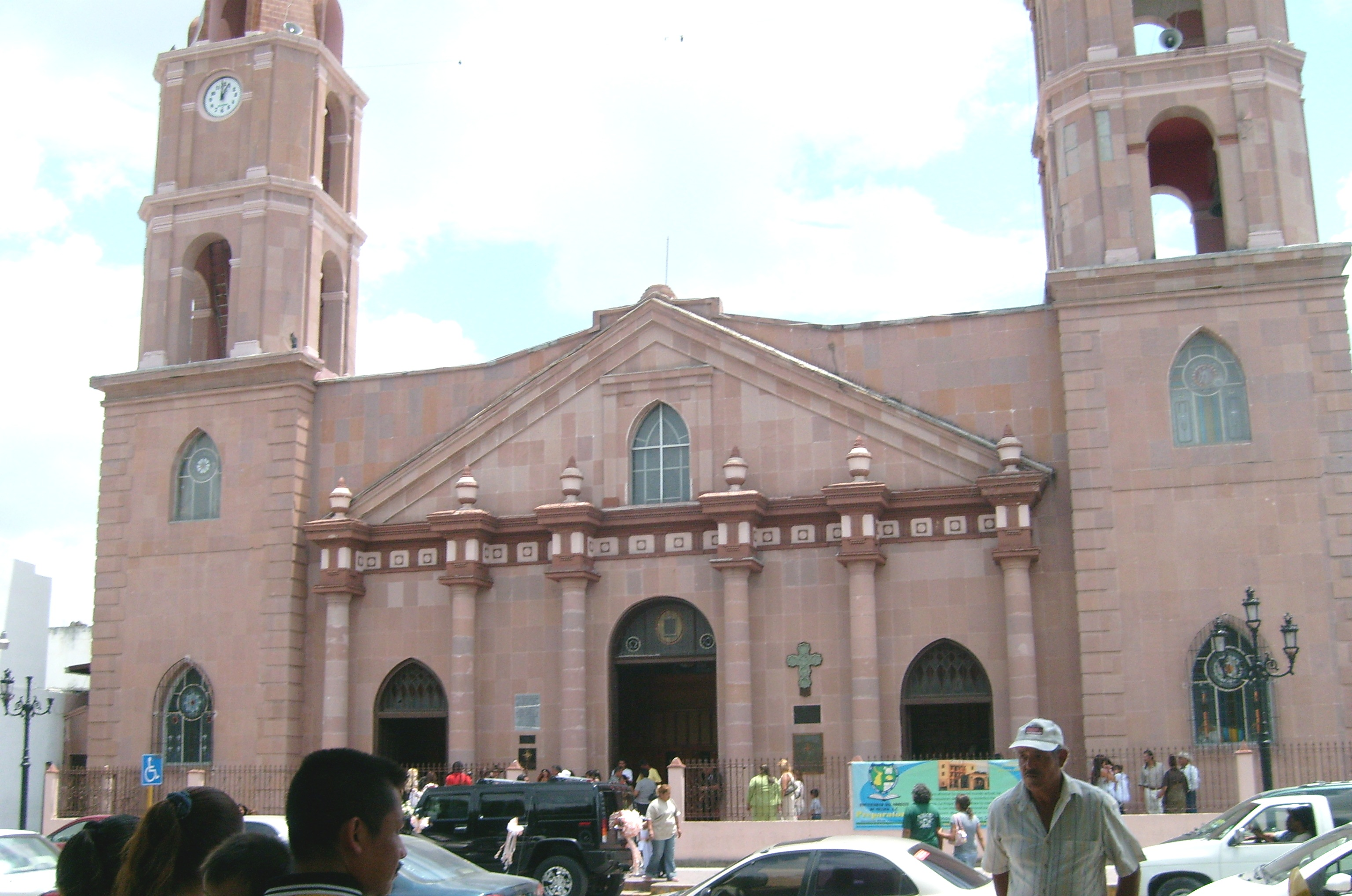
- Catedral de Nuestra Señora del Refugio

Location
- Country: Mexico
- Ecclesiastical province: Province of Monterrey
- Coordinates: 25.8801°N 97.5033°W

Statistics
- Area: 7,515 sq mi (19,460 km^{2})
- Population: Total; Catholics: (as of 2004); 1,850,000; 1,665,000 (90%)
- Parishes: 56

Information
- Denomination: Catholic Church
- Sui iuris church: Latin Church
- Rite: Roman Rite
- Established: 16 February 1958 (68 years ago)
- Cathedral: Cathedral of Our Lady of Refuge

Current leadership
- Pope: Leo XIV
- Bishop: Eugenio Lira Rugarcía
- Metropolitan Archbishop: Rogelio Cabrera López

Map
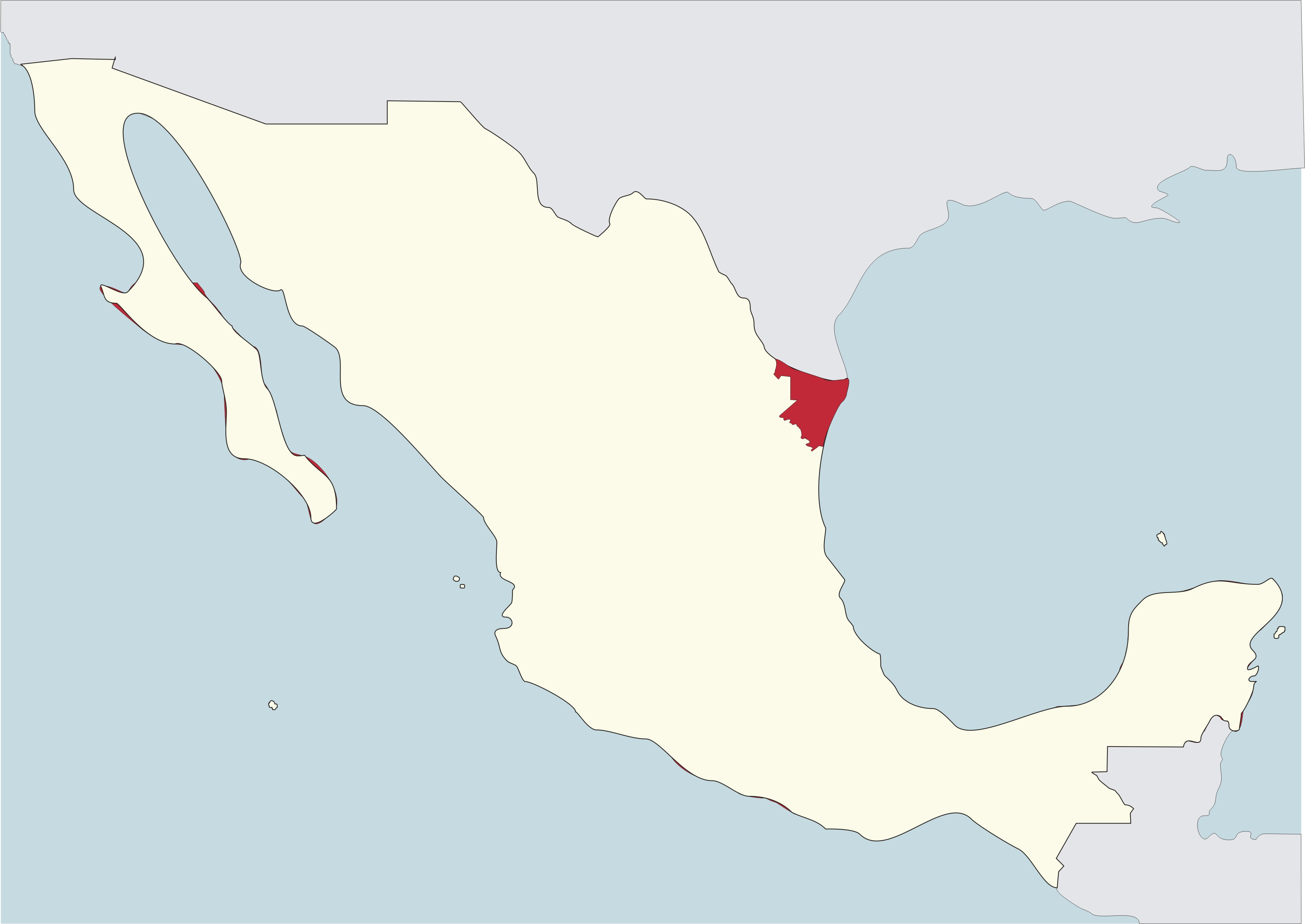

Website
- https://diocesismr.org/

The Diocese of Matamoros-Reynosa (Latin: Dioecesis Matamorensis) is a Latin Church ecclesiastical territory or diocese of the Catholic Church in the northeast part of the Mexican state of Tamaulipas, along the border with Texas, United States. The diocese is a suffragan in the ecclesiastical province of the metropolitan Archdiocese of Monterrey.

== History ==
When the first Catholic missionaries, de Silva and Puellea, arrived in 1793, this region was under the ecclesiastical jurisdiction of the Diocese of Linares. However, beginning with the first bishop, Fray Antonio de Jesús Sacedón, all bishops had resided in Monterrey (but the name of the diocese, after 1891 Archdiocese, was changed in Monterrey only in 1922).

With the papal bull "Ad futuram rei memoriam", Pius IX created the Apostolic Vicariate of Tamaulipas, on August 13, 1861, under the pastoral care of Francisco de la Concepción Ramírez.

Less than a decade later on March 12, 1870, Pius IX promulgated Papal Bull "Apostolicam in universas", thereby elevating the Vicariate to diocese with its seat in Ciudad Victoria. Appointed as the first bishop of Tamaulipas was Mons. Ignacio Montes de Oca y Obregón, who had been the personal chaplain to Emperor Maximilian.

In 1922, the episcopal seat was moved by Bishop Jose Guadalupe Ortiz y López from the state capital Ciudad Victoria to Tampico, which had grown to become the largest city in the state. Tampico, located in the far southeast corner of the state, had become Tamaulipas's economic center due to its port, trade and the discovery of oil.

=== Diocese of Matamoros ===
In 1958, Tamaulipas was divided into two dioceses: Matamoros and Tampico.

With the advent of extensive irrigation, prosperity and population growth came to northern Tamaulipas. On February 16, 1958, Pius XII promulgated Papal Bull "Haud inani", creating a new diocese, extending from San Fernando to Nuevo Laredo, with its seat in Matamoros. The parish church of Our Lady of Refuge became the cathedral. Pope John XXIII named the first bishop of the new diocese: Mons. Estanislao Alcaraz y Figueroa. Mons. Alcaraz was consecrated bishop on April 12, 1959.

The diocese was renamed the Diocese of Matamoros-Reynosa, to include a specific reference to the city of Reynosa, in July 2024.

== Bishops ==
- Estanislao Alcaraz y Figueroa (1959–1968), appointed Bishop of San Luis Potosí
- Sabás Magaña García (1968–1990)
- Francisco Javier Chavolla Ramos (1991–2003), appointed Bishop of Toluca, México
- Faustino Armendáriz Jiménez (2005–2011), appointed Bishop of Querétaro
- Ruy Rendón Leal (2011–2016), appointed Archbishop of Hermosillo, Sonora
- Eugenio Lira Rugarcía (2016–Present)

=== Other priest of this diocese who became bishop ===
- Margarito Salazar Cárdenas, appointed Bishop of Matehuala, San Luís Potosí, in 2018
