= Diocese of Atlacomulco =

Roman Catholic diocese in Mexico

Coordinates: 19.7998°N 99.8734°W

Diocese of Atlacomulco Dioecesis Atlacomulcana Diócesis de Atlacomulco
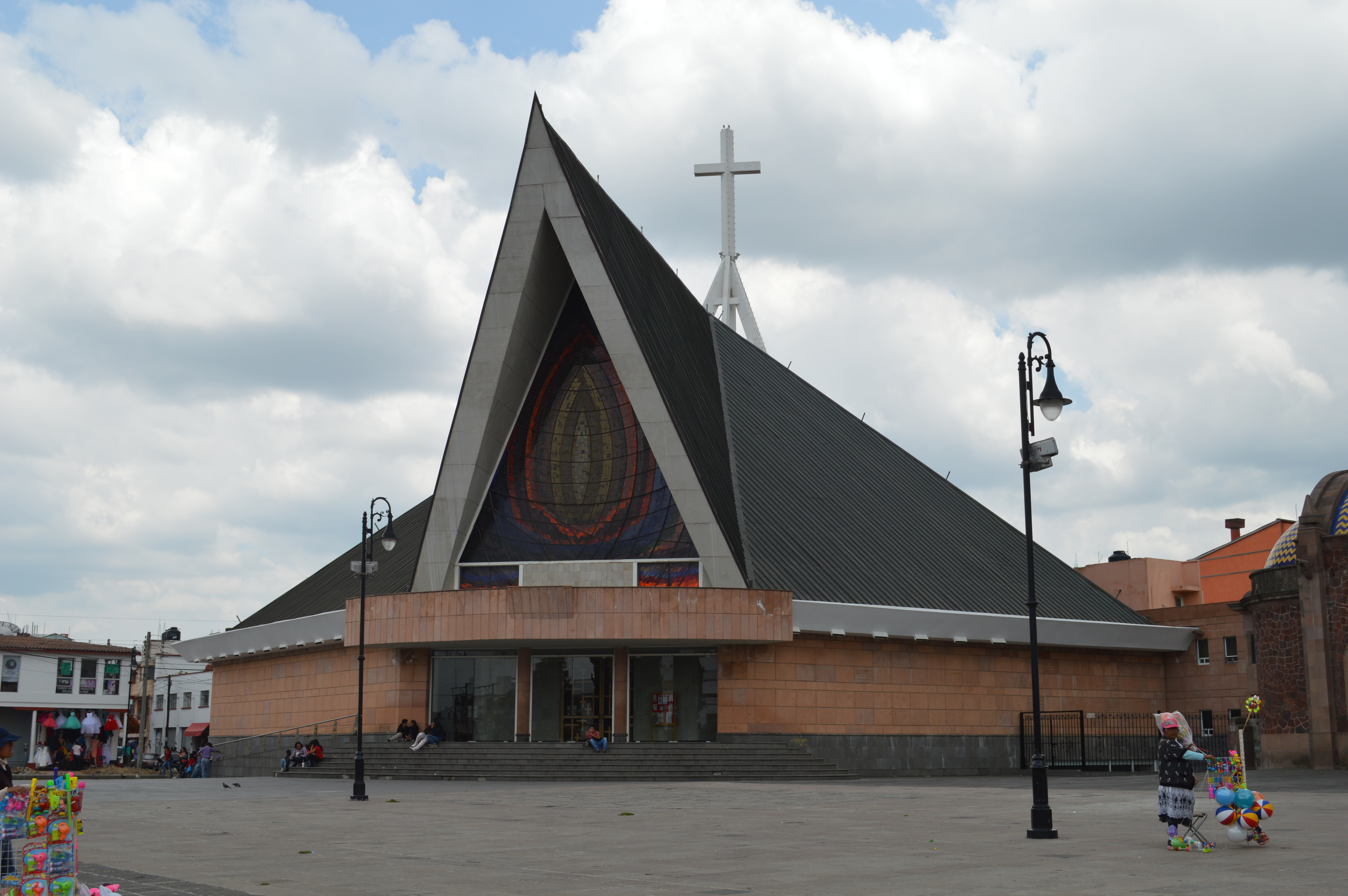

Location
- Country: Mexico
- Metropolitan: Archdiocese of Toluca
- Headquarters: Atlacomulco, State of Mexico, Mexico

Statistics
- Area: 5,364 km^{2} (2,071 sq mi)
- Population: Total; Catholics: (as of 2023); 1,144,500; 915,600 (80.0%)
- Parishes: 66

Information
- Denomination: Catholic Church
- Sui iuris church: Latin Church
- Rite: Roman Rite
- Established: 3 November 1984; 41 years ago
- Cathedral: Cathedral of the Divine Providence
- Secular priests: 118 Diocesan

Current leadership
- Pope: Leo XIV
- Bishop: Adolfo Miguel Castaño Fonseca
- Metropolitan Archbishop: Raúl Gómez González
- Bishops emeritus: Juan Odilón Martínez García

Map
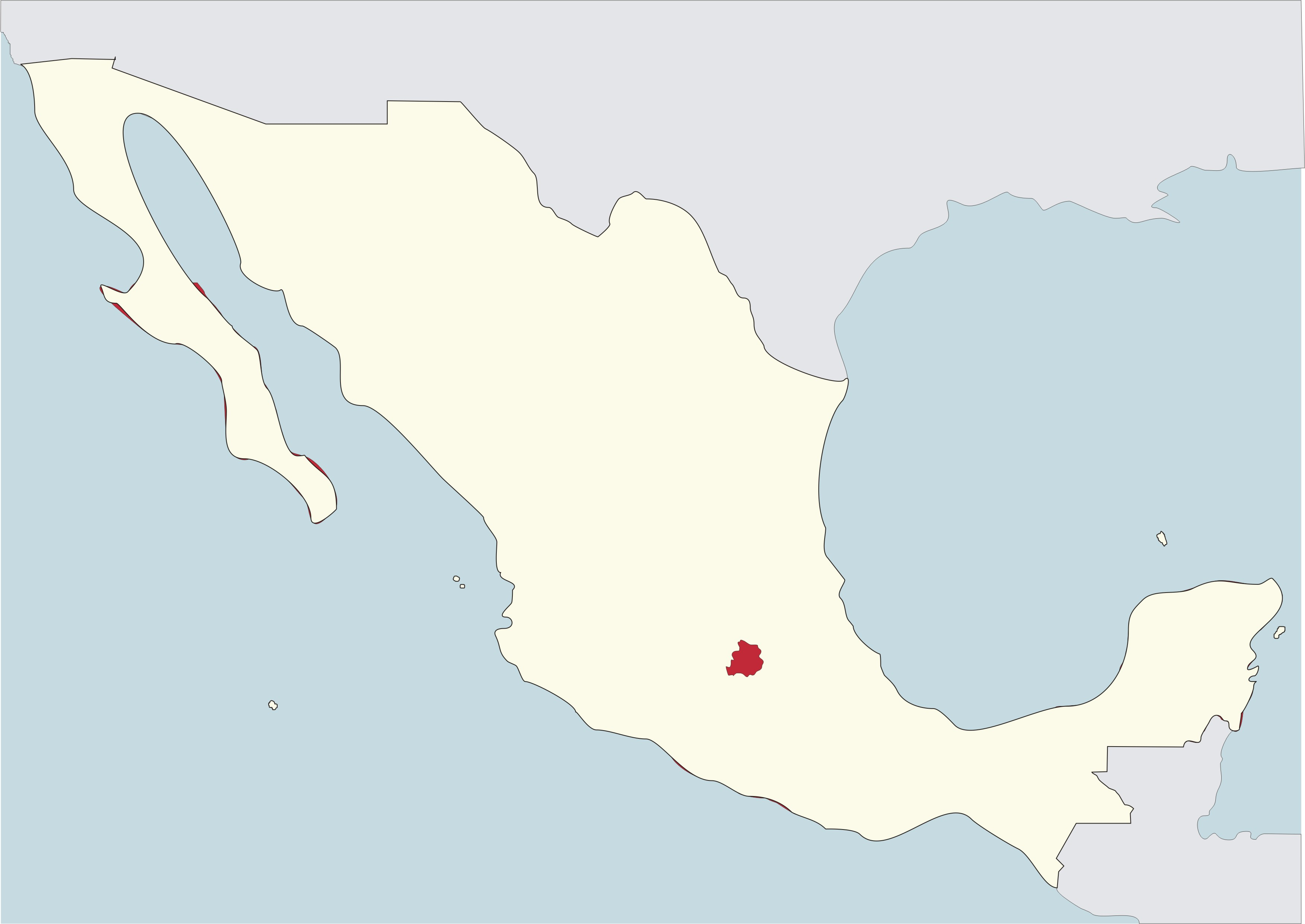

The Roman Catholic Diocese of Atlacomulco (Latin: Dioecesis Atlacomulcana) (erected 3 November 1984) is a suffragan diocese of the Archdiocese of Toluca in Mexico.

== Leadership ==
=== Bishops of Atlacomulco ===
- Ricardo Guízar Díaz (3 November – 14 August 1996), appointed Archbishop of Tlalnepantla, México
- Constancio Miranda Weckmann (27 June 1998 – 29 September 2009), appointed Archbishop of Chihuahua
- Juan Odilón Martínez García (30 April 2010 – 3 July 2024), retired
  - Apostolic Administrator Juan Pedro Juárez Meléndez (3 July 2024 – 13 April 2026), Bishop of Tula
- Adolfo Miguel Castaño Fonseca (11 February 2026 – Present)

=== Another priest of this diocese who became bishop ===
- Maximino Martínez Miranda (1984-2006), appointed Bishop of Ciudad Altamirano, Guerrero in 2006

== Episcopal See ==
- Atlacomulco, State of México

== External links and references ==
- "Diocese of Atlacomulco". Catholic-Hierarchy.
