= Matamoros Cathedral =

Our Lady of Refuge Cathedral
- Catedral de Nuestra Señora del Refugio
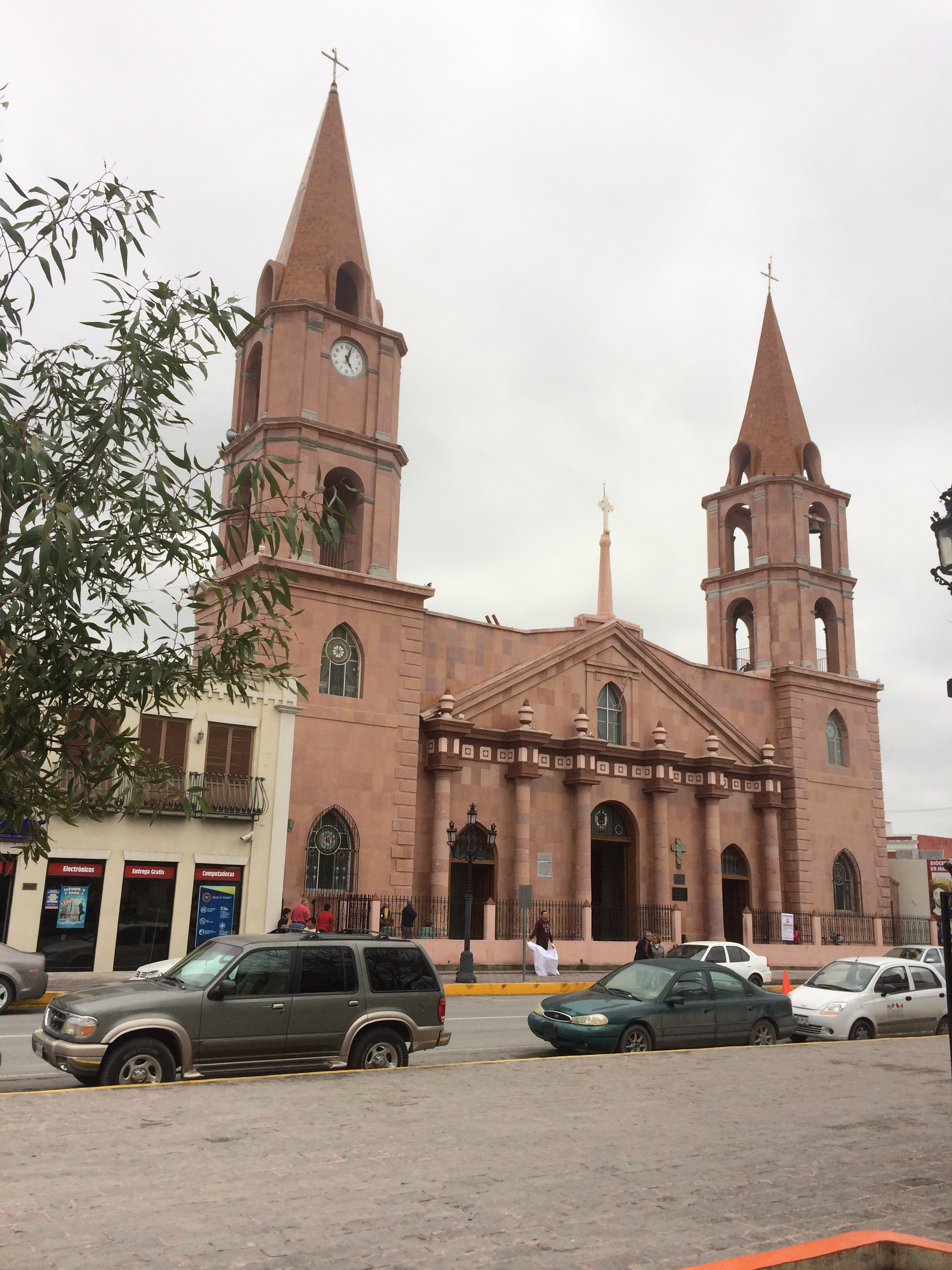
- Our Lady of Refuge Cathedral
- Location: Matamoros, Tamaulipas
- Country: Mexico
- Denomination: Roman Catholic Church

The Cathedral of Our Lady of Refuge (Spanish: Catedral de Nuestra Señora del Refugio), also known as the Matamoros Cathedral (Spanish: Catedral de Matamoros), is the main Catholic church in the city of Matamoros, Tamaulipas, Mexico. It is the seat of the Diocese of Matamoros-Reynosa. It was built in the 19th century, and is located in the historical center of the city.

== History and structure ==
The work was initiated by Father Nicolás Ballí in the early nineteenth century. The church, with Neoclassical architecture, has three naves. Over the years the cathedral has undergone slight modifications.

The façade, also in Neoclassical style, has three access arches flanked by Tuscan columns, six in total.

The cathedral holds several written accounts, such as newspapers, burials, marriages, confirmations, and government documents, of the Texas Revolution.

== See also ==
- Roman Catholicism in Mexico

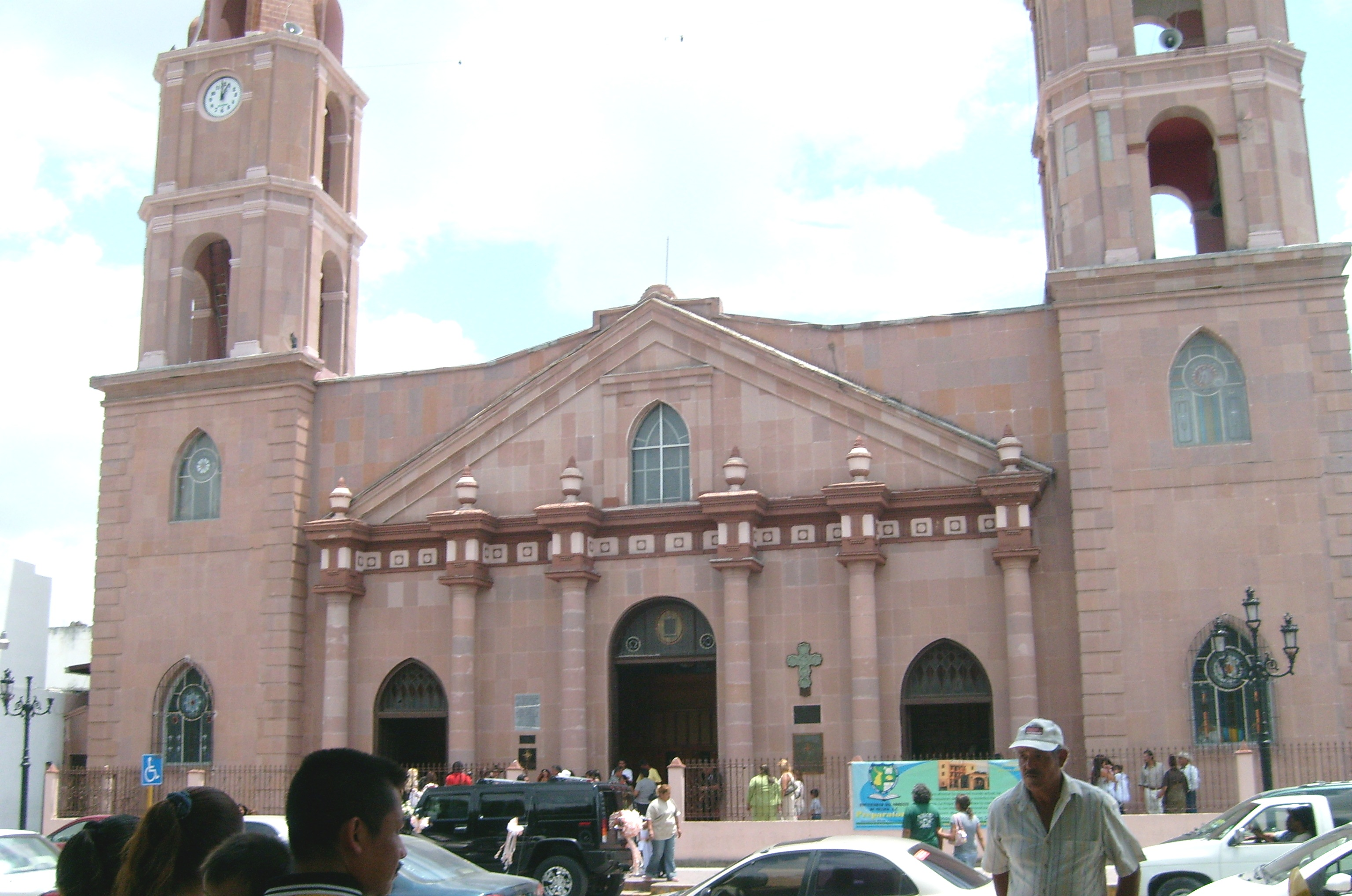
Another View
