= Toluca Cathedral =

Coordinates: 19.2916°N 99.6572°W

- Catedral de Toluca
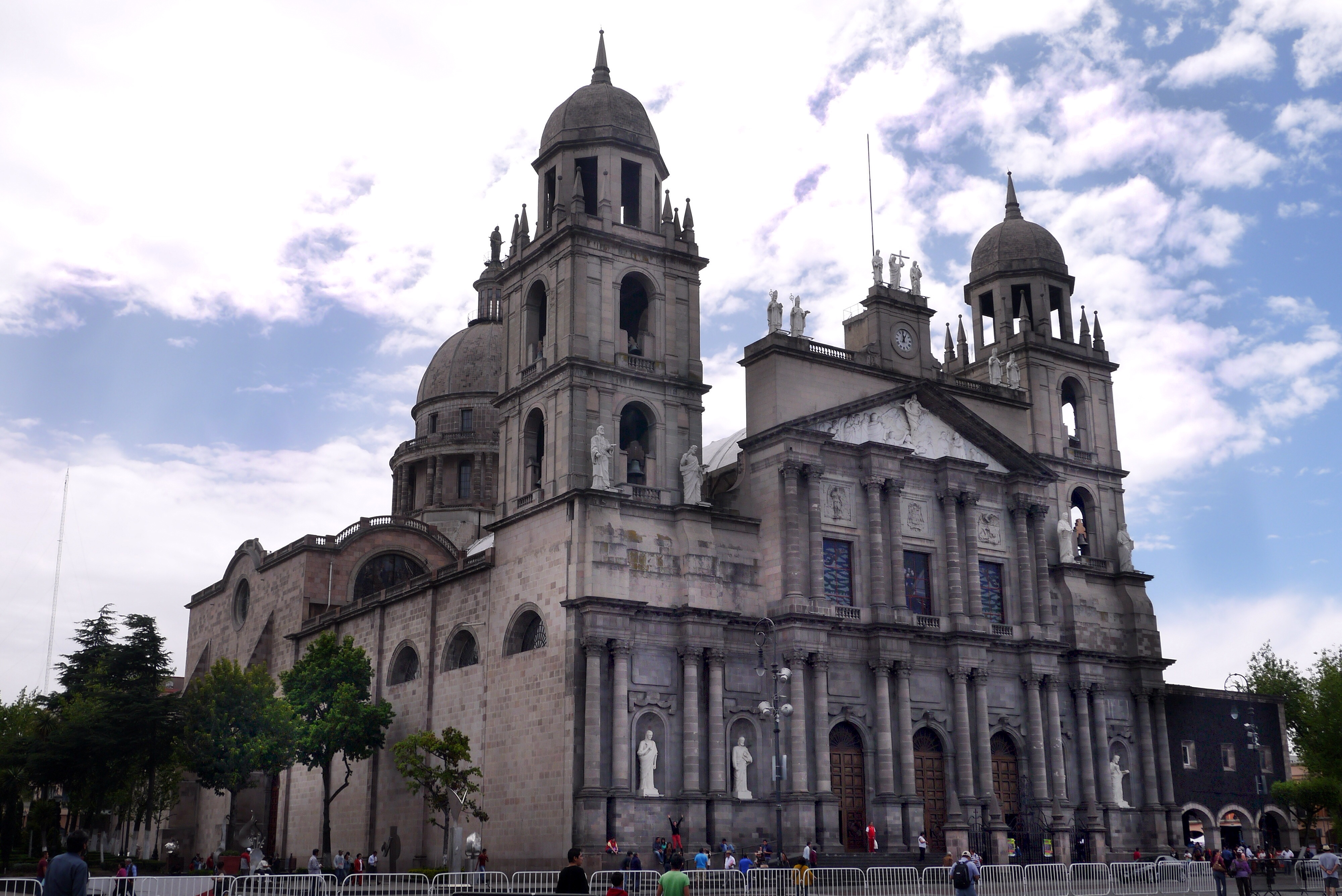
- Toluca Cathedral
- Country: Mexico
- Denomination: Roman Catholic

History
- Status: Cathedral
- Dedicated: 11 April 1978

Architecture
- Functional status: Active
- Groundbreaking: 12 May 1867
- Completed: 1978

Administration
- Division: Roman Catholic Archdiocese of Toluca

Toluca Cathedral, formally Cathedral of Saint Joseph of Nazareth (Spanish: Catedral de San José de Nazaret) is a Roman Catholic cathedral in the city of Toluca, Mexico, named after Saint Joseph.

The cathedral's construction began in 1867, but was completed only in the second half of the twentieth century. The Neoclassical façade features the images of Saint John, Saint Thomas, Saint Peter and Saint James. There is also a relief depicting the Ascension of Jesus. Above the clock there are three female figures representing faith, charity and hope.

== History ==
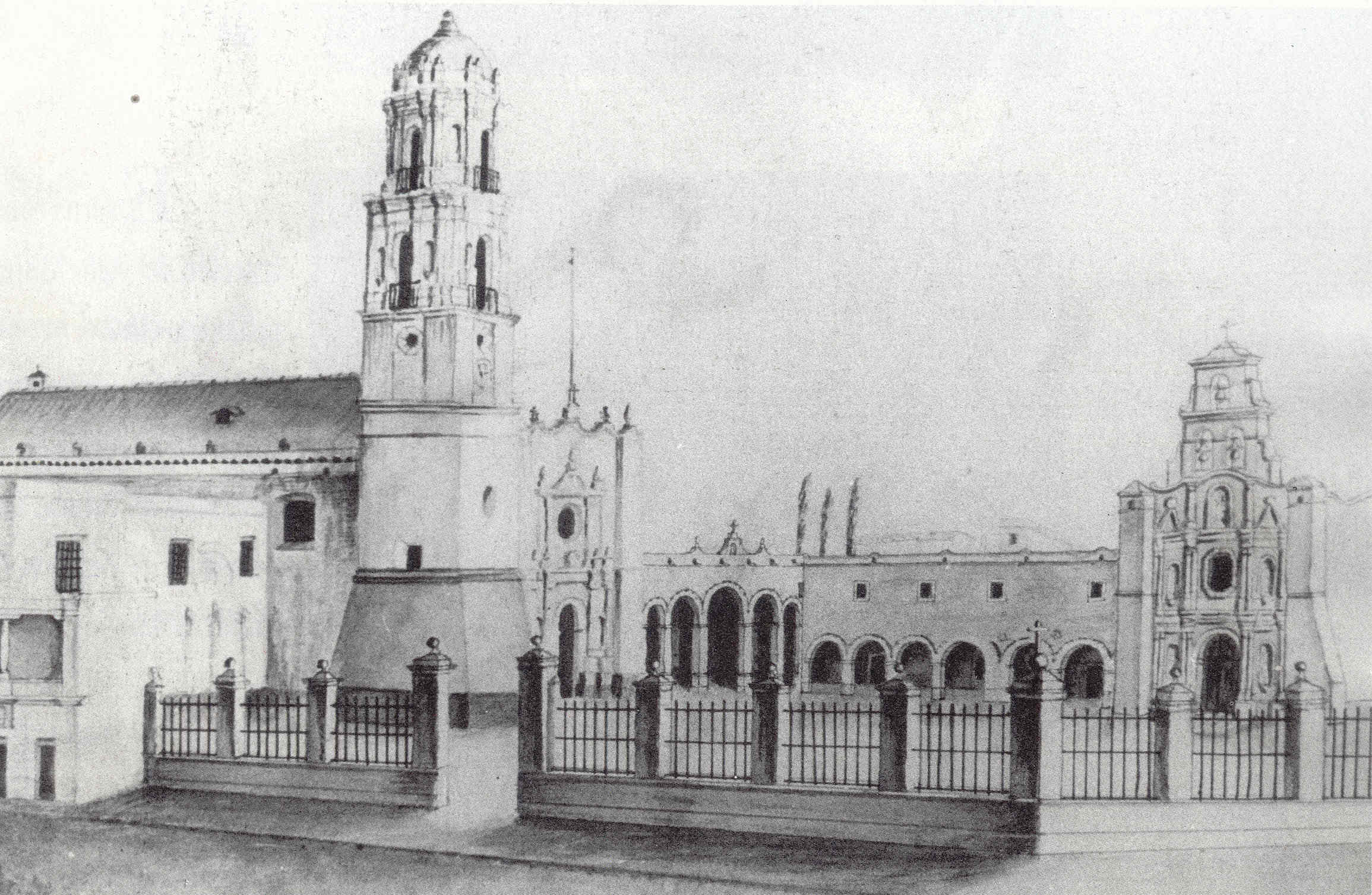
Lithography of the Conventual complex of la asunción de María this drawing was made approximately 10 years after the former convent was demolished.

Soon after the Spanish conquest of the Aztec Empire was the arrival of Franciscan missionaries such as Martin de Valencia, Juan de Tecto, Juan de Ahora, and Pedro de Gante, who established missions and the first school called San Antonio de Padua. In the mid-16th century, the Franciscans built the Assumption Convent, which was used by the Order for evangelization.

By 1867, due to the deplorable condition of the building and the increase in Toluca's population, it was decided to demolish it. Based on plans presented by architect Ramón Rodríguez Arangoiti, construction began on the new building, which would be built in the neoclassical style.

Progress on the work was slow and was not resumed until almost a century later, after Pope Pius XII created the Diocese of Toluca in 1950, a decision that stimulated the work. The project resumed in 1951 under the direction of architect Vicente Mendiola, maintaining the original style, albeit with some modifications. For the construction of the cathedral, the Rosario Chapel and the Chapel of San Joseph, both of which were located on the large plot belonging to the old Franciscan convent, were demolished.

Two figures are worthy of mention here: Fray Buenaventura Merlín, the initiator of the construction of the Toluca Cathedral, and the first Bishop of the Diocese of Toluca, Arturo Vélez Martínez, the driving force behind the project until its consecration on 11 April 1978.
