= Francisco Javier Chavolla Ramos =

Mexican Catholic archbishop (born 1946)

The Most Reverend Francisco Javier Chavolla Ramos
- Archbishop Emeritus of Toluca
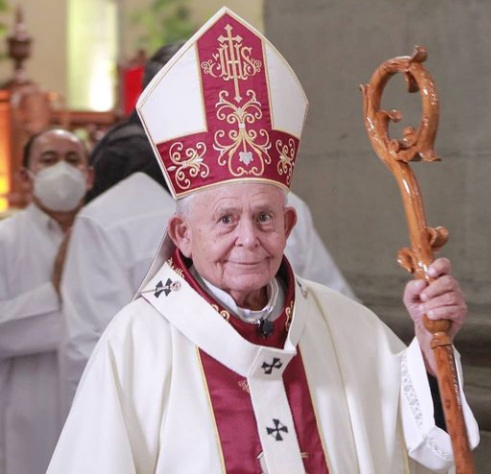
- Chavolla Ramos in 2019
- Church: Catholic Church
- Archdiocese: Toluca
- Appointed: 28 September 2019
- Installed: 18 November 2019
- Term ended: 19 March 2022
- Predecessor: See predecessor as bishop of Toluca
- Successor: Raúl Gómez González
- Previous posts: Bishop of Matamoros (1991–2003); Bishop of Toluca (2003–2019)

Orders
- Ordination: 10 December 1972 by Juan Jesús Posadas Ocampo
- Consecration: 16 July 1991 by Girolamo Prigione

Personal details
- Born: 3 June 1946 (age 80) Autlán de la Grana, Jalisco, Mexico
- Education: Pontifical Teresianum Institute
- Motto: In Caritate Dei et Patientia Christi
- Coat of arms

Francisco Javier Chavolla Ramos (born 3 June 1946) is a Mexican Catholic prelate who served as the Archbishop of Toluca from 2019 to 2022. He was the first metropolitan archbishop of Toluca after the Holy See elevated the Diocese of Toluca to a metropolitan archdiocese in 2019. He previously served as Bishop of Matamoros from 1991 to 2003 and Bishop of Toluca from 2003 to 2019. He became archbishop emeritus upon his retirement in 2022.

== Early life and education ==
Chavolla Ramos was born on 3 June 1946 in Autlán de la Grana, in the Mexican state of Jalisco, then within the Archdiocese of Guadalajara. He entered the Minor Seminary of the Diocese of Tijuana in 1959, where he studied secondary education and philosophy. He subsequently continued his theological studies at the Pontifical Seminary of Montezuma in the United States.

He was ordained a priest for the Diocese of Tijuana on 10 December 1972. As a priest he served as a parish vicar and pastor in several parishes. In 1978 he was appointed spiritual director of the Major Seminary of Tijuana, a position he held until his appointment to the episcopate.

Chavolla also made studies in spiritual theology at the Pontifical Teresianum Institute in Rome. His pastoral assignments in Tijuana included service at parishes in Tijuana and Tecate.

== Episcopate ==
=== Bishop of Matamoros ===
On 1 June 1991, Pope John Paul II appointed Chavolla Bishop of Matamoros. He received his episcopal consecration on 16 July 1991. His principal consecrator was Archbishop Girolamo Prigione, with Archbishop Adolfo Antonio Suárez Rivera and Bishop Emilio Carlos Berlie Belaunzarán serving as principal co-consecrators.

During his episcopate he was involved in the work of the Mexican Episcopal Conference, including service related to family pastoral ministry. He subsequently became involved with the episcopal commission dealing with life issues.

=== Bishop of Toluca ===
On 27 December 2003, Pope John Paul II appointed Chavolla Bishop of Toluca, succeeding Francisco Robles Ortega. He took canonical possession of the Diocese of Toluca on 12 February 2004.

Chavolla served as the fourth Bishop of Toluca and remained in the post for approximately 15 years. During his tenure he emphasized pastoral attention to priests and family ministry. In the Mexican Episcopal Conference, he held responsibilities connected with the pastoral care of families and life.

In 2016, the Diocese of Toluca marked the 25th anniversary of Chavolla's episcopal ordination with celebrations attended by bishops from across Mexico.

=== First Archbishop of Toluca ===
On 28 September 2019, Pope Francis elevated the ecclesiastical province of Toluca, raising the Diocese of Toluca to the rank of metropolitan church and assigning the dioceses of Atlacomulco, Tenancingo, and Cuernavaca as suffragans. Chavolla was appointed the first Metropolitan Archbishop of Toluca.

He made his canonical installation as metropolitan archbishop on 18 November 2019. The ceremony included his profession of faith and oath of fidelity, and was attended by Mexico's apostolic nuncio, Franco Coppola, and other Mexican bishops and civil officials. The establishment of the metropolitan province made Toluca the metropolitan see for the three suffragan dioceses. Chavolla consequently became the first archbishop to hold the newly created metropolitan office.

=== Retirement ===
Having reached the customary retirement age for diocesan bishops, Chavolla submitted his resignation in 2021. On 19 March 2022, Pope Francis accepted his resignation as Metropolitan Archbishop of Toluca and appointed Bishop Raúl Gómez González of Tenancingo as his successor.

Following the end of his tenure, Chavolla entered a period of retirement or "rest" after 19 years leading the Diocese and Archdiocese of Toluca. His successor stated that Chavolla would continue to exercise his ministry as a bishop but would no longer have responsibility for a diocese or parish.
