= Florencio Olvera Ochoa =

Mexican Catholic bishop (1933–2020)

- Bishop of Cuernavaca
- Church: Catholic Church
- Diocese: Diocese of Cuernavaca
- In office: 22 February 2002 – 10 July 2009
- Predecessor: Luis Reynoso Cervantes
- Successor: Alfonso Cortés Contreras
- Previous post: Bishop of Tabasco (1992-2002)

Orders
- Ordination: 26 October 1958
- Consecration: 30 November 1992 by Girolamo Prigione

Personal details
- Born: 12 October 1933 Tequisquiapan, Querétaro, Mexico
- Died: 20 December 2020 (aged 87)

Florencio Olvera Ochoa (12 October 1933 – 20 December 2020) was a Mexican Bishop of the Roman Catholic Diocese of Cuernavaca from 2002 to 2009.

Olvera was born in Tequisquiapan, Mexico. He was ordained priest in Querétaro in 1958, was appointed bishop of Tabasco in 1992 and bishop of Cuernavaca in 2002. On 10 July 2009 Pope Benedict XVI accepted his resignation for reaching the age limit of 75 years.

Ochoa died from COVID-19 in 2020.

== Electoral Decalogue ==
Ignoring Mexican electoral laws, Bishop Olvera published an "Electoral Decalogue" that attempts to indicate to Mexican Roman Catholics for which political party to vote in the 2009 legislative election.

== References and sources ==
- Bishop Florencio Olvera Ochoa
- Obispo alienta a mexicanos a elegir sabiamente con decálogo electoral
- Cita Gobernación a Florencio Olvera, obispo de Cuernavaca

Specific
