= Roman Catholic Diocese of Cuernavaca =

Roman Catholic diocese in Mexico

Diocese of Cuernavaca Dioecesis Cuernavacensis Diócesis de Cuernavaca
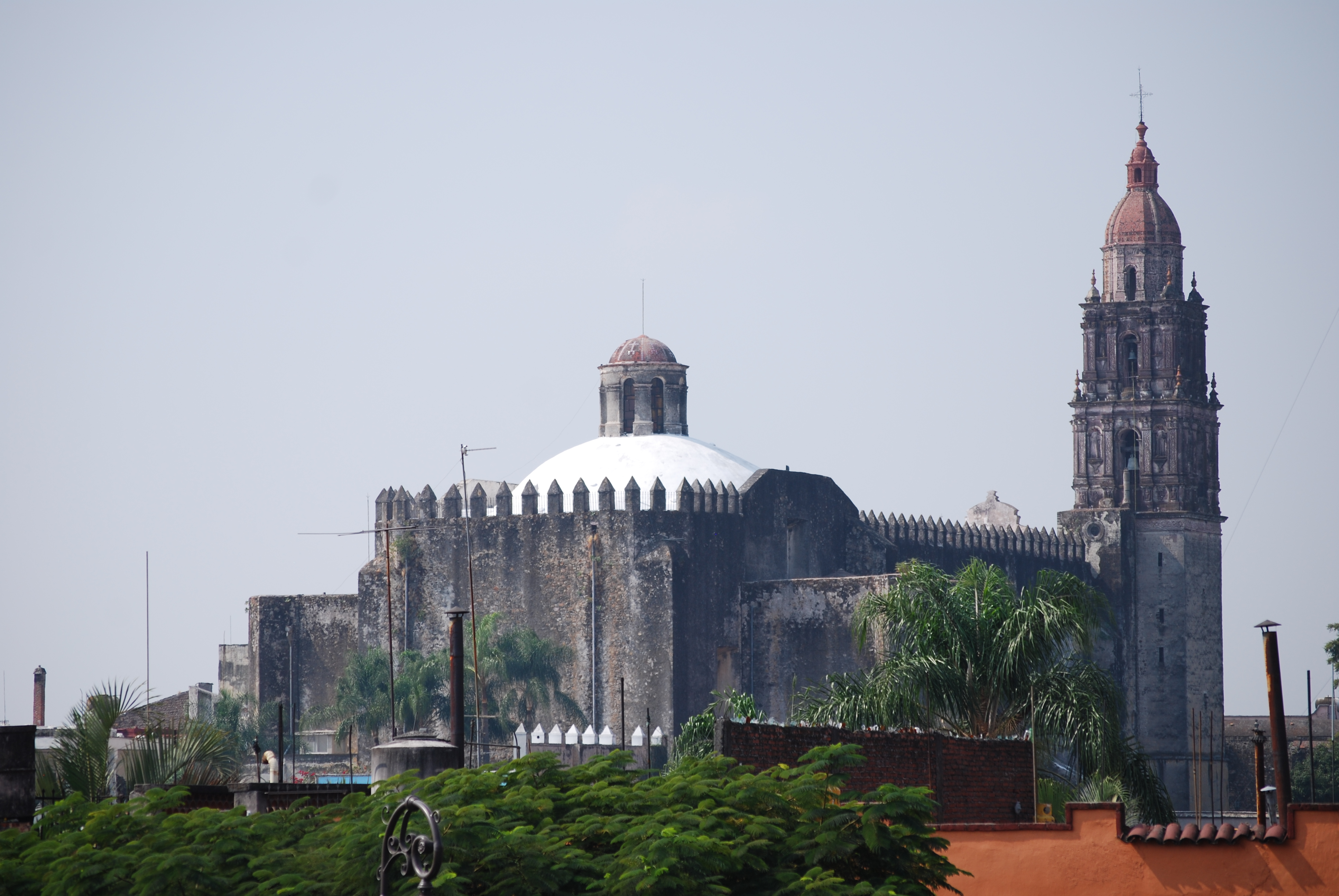
- Catedral de la Asunción de María

Location
- Country: Mexico
- Ecclesiastical province: Province of Toluca
- Metropolitan: Cuernavaca

Statistics
- Area: 1,908 sq mi (4,940 km^{2})
- Population: Total; Catholics: (as of 2006); 2,144,000; 1,854,000 (86.5%)
- Parishes: 109

Information
- Denomination: Roman Catholic
- Rite: Roman Rite
- Established: 23 June 1891 (133 years ago)
- Cathedral: Cathedral of the Assumption of Mary

Current leadership
- Pope: Francis
- Bishop: Ramón Castro Castro
- Metropolitan Archbishop: Francisco Javier Chavolla Ramos

Map
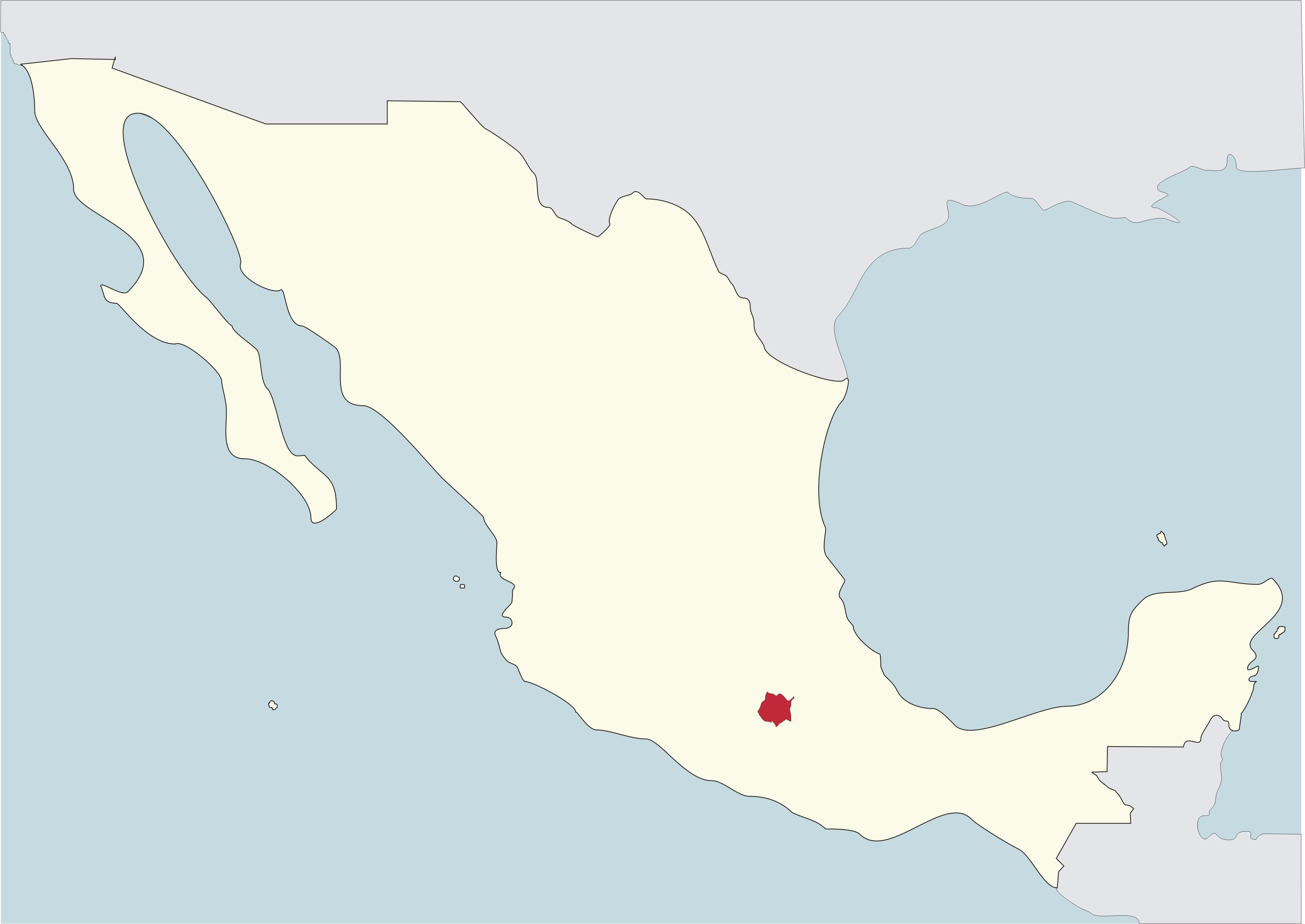

The Roman Catholic Diocese of Cuernavaca (Latin: Dioecesis Cuernavacensis) (erected 23 June 1891) is a suffragan diocese of the Archdiocese of Toluca. Its seat is in the Cuernavaca Cathedral. S.E.R. Mons. Ramón Castro Castro was named 12th Bishop of Cuernavaca by Pope Francis on May 15, 2013.

== Ordinaries ==
- Fortino Hipólito Vera y Talonia (1894–1898).
- Francisco Plancarte y Navarrete (1898–1911), appointed Archbishop of Linares o Nueva León, Nuevo León.
- Manuel Fulcheri y Pietrasanta (1912–1922), appointed Bishop of Zamora, Michoacán.
- Francisco Uranga y Sáenz (1922–1930).
- Francisco María González y Arias (1931–1946).
- Alfonso Espino y Silva (1947–1951), appointed Coadjutor Archbishop of Monterrey, Nuevo León.
- Sergio Méndez Arceo (1952–1982).
- Juan Jesús Posadas Ocampo (1982–1987), appointed Archbishop of Guadalajara, Jalisco, México; elevated to Cardinal in 1991.
- Luis Reynoso Cervantes (1987–2000).
- Florencio Olvera Ochoa (2002–2009).
- Alfonso Cortes Contreras (2009–2012), appointed Archbishop of León, Guanajuato.
- S.E.R. Mons. Ramón Castro Castro (2012–present)

== Episcopal See ==
- Cuernavaca, Morelos

== External links and references ==
- "Diocese of Cuernavaca". Catholic-Hierarchy.
