= Capilla de Guadalupe =

Capilla de Guadalupe, Jalisco
- City
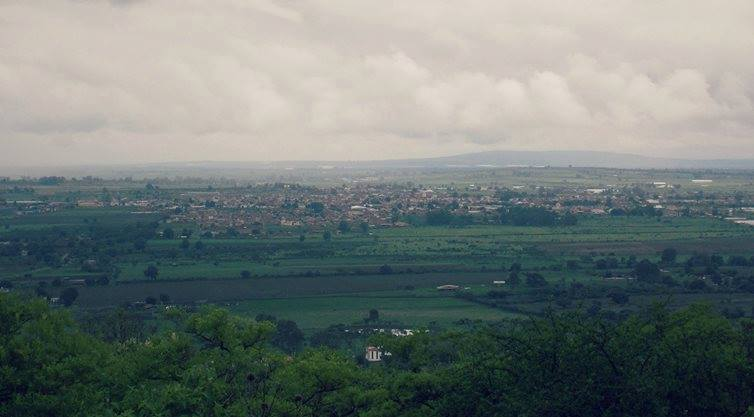

- Location in Mexico Capilla de Guadalupe, Jalisco (Mexico)
- Coordinates: 20°39′N 102°48′W
- Country: Mexico
- State: Jalisco

Population (2020)
  - Total: 15,640
- Time zone: UTC-6 (Central Standard Time)
  - Summer (DST): UTC-5 (Central Daylight Time)

Capilla de Guadalupe is a delegation and census-designated place within the municipality of Tepatitlan, in Jalisco in central-western Mexico. The population was 15,640 according to the 2020 census.

The population had previously been recorded as 20,601 in the 2010 census.
