= Diocese of Tenancingo =

Roman Catholic diocese in Mexico

Coordinates: 18.9651°N 99.5935°W

Diocese of Tenancingo Dioecesis Tenancingana Diócesis de Tenancingo
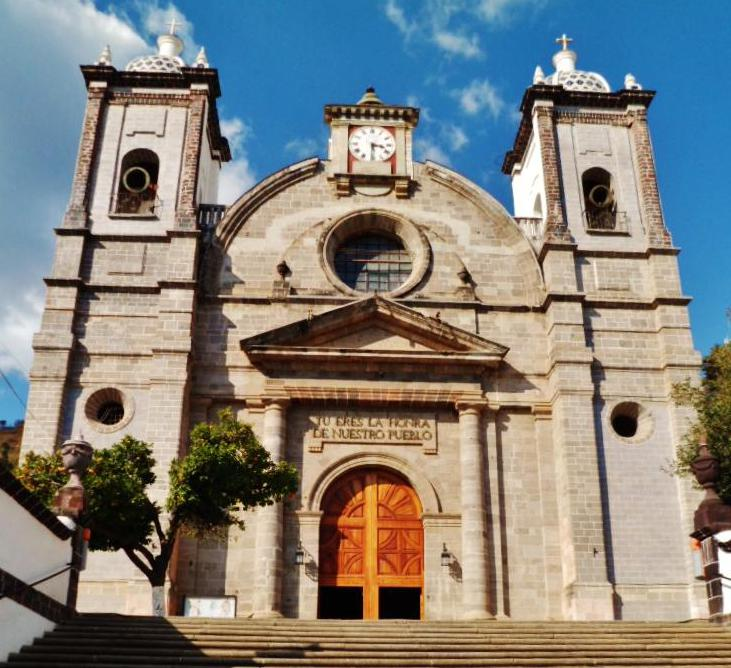

Location
- Country: Mexico
- Metropolitan: Archdiocese of Toluca

Statistics
- Area: 1,939 sq mi (5,020 km^{2})
- Population: Total; Catholics: (as of 2009); 350,406; 332,829 (95%)
- Parishes: 28

Information
- Denomination: Roman Catholic
- Rite: Roman Rite
- Established: 26 November 2009 (15 years ago)
- Cathedral: Cathedral of the Calvary

Current leadership
- Pope: Leo XIV
- Bishop: Víctor Carabés Cháves
- Metropolitan Archbishop: Raúl Gómez González

Map
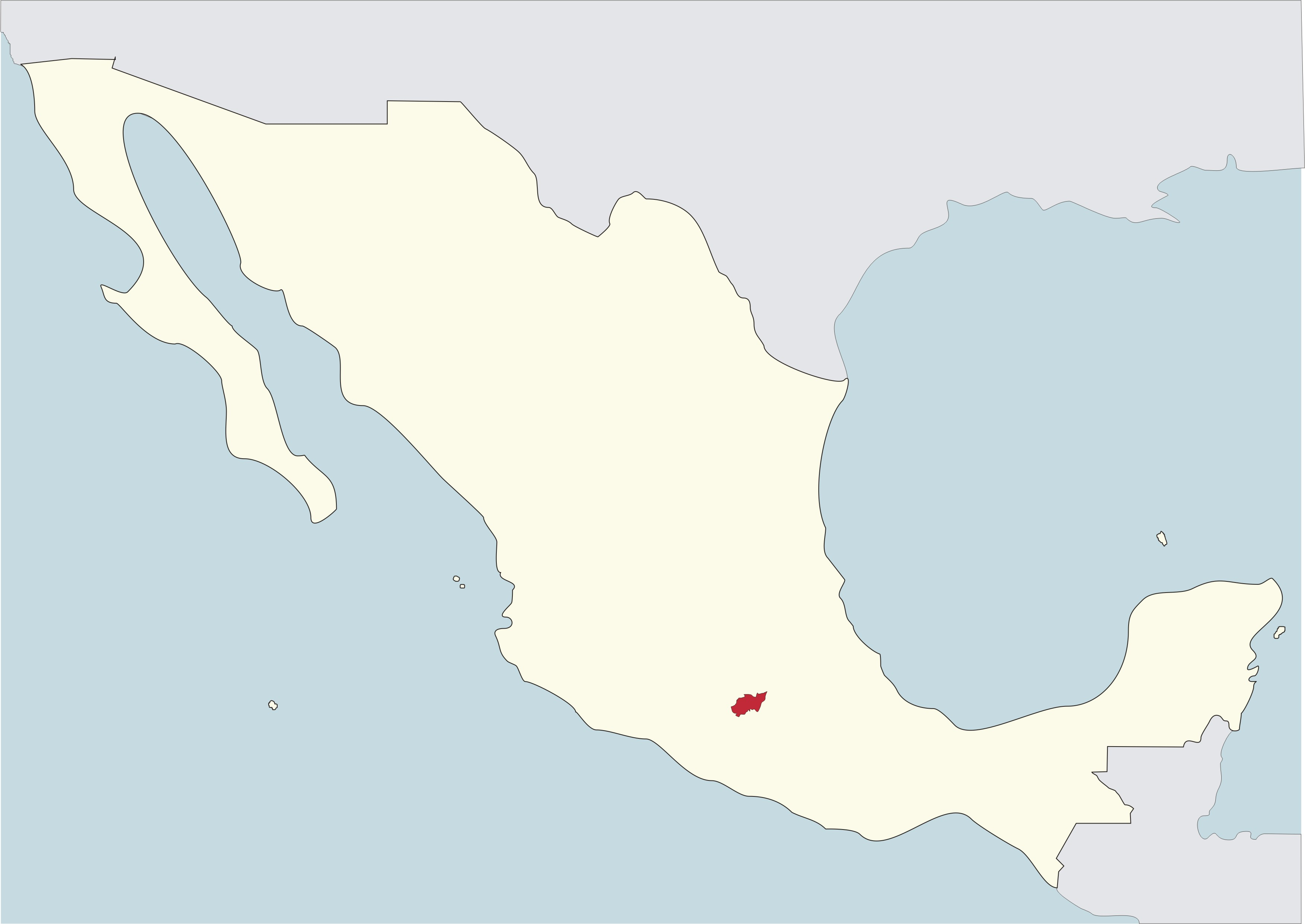

The Roman Catholic Diocese of Tenancingo (Latin: Dioecesis Tenancingana) (erected 26 November 2009) is a suffragan diocese of the Archdiocese of Toluca.

== Ordinaries ==
- Bishop Raúl Gómez González (2009–2022)
- Bishop Víctor Carabés Cháves, M.N.M. (2024–)

== Episcopal See ==
- Tenancingo, State of Mexico

== External links and references ==
- "Diocese of Tenancingo". Catholic-Hierarchy.

Specific
