= Cuernavaca Cathedral =

Church building in Cuernavaca, Mexico

Cathedral of the Assumption of Mary Catedral de la Asunción de María
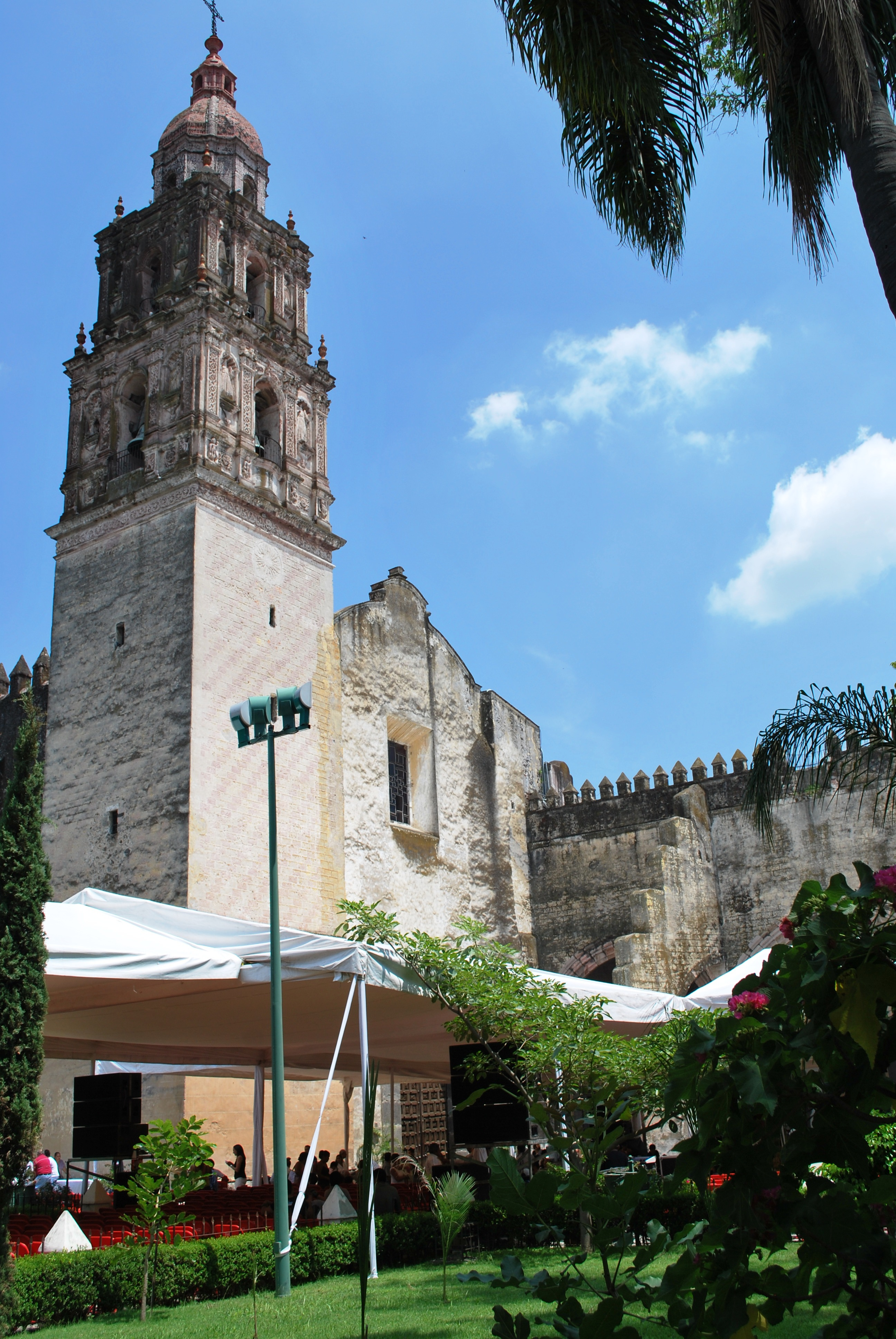
- Facade and belltower of the cathedral

Religion
- Affiliation: Roman Catholic
- Province: Diocese of Cuernavaca
- Rite: Roman Rite
- Ecclesiastical or organisational status: cathedral
- Leadership: Bis. Alfonso Cortés Contreras
- Year consecrated: 16th century

Location
- Location: Cuernavaca, Mexico
- Interactive map of Cathedral of the Assumption of Mary; Catedral de la Asunción de María
- Coordinates: 18°55′12.77″N 99°14′12.41″W

Architecture
- Type: church
- Style: Baroque
- Groundbreaking: 1529
- Completed: 1534

Specifications
- Length: 80 metres (260 ft)
- Width: 40 metres (130 ft)
- Spire: 1
- UNESCO World Heritage Site
- Official name: Earliest 16th century monasteries on the slopes of Popocatépetl
- Type: Cultural
- Criteria: ii, iv
- Designated: 1994
- Reference no.: 702
- State Party: Mexico
- Region: Latin America and the Caribbean

Website
- diocesisdecuernavaca.org.mx

The Cuernavaca Cathedral (Spanish: Catedral de la Asunción de María) is the Roman Catholic church of the Diocese of Cuernavaca, located in the city of Cuernavaca, Morelos, Mexico. The church and its surrounding monastery is one of the early 16th century monasteries in the vicinity of the Popocatepetl volcano inscribed as a World Heritage Site by UNESCO, built initially for evangelization efforts of indigenous people after the Spanish conquest of the Aztec Empire. By the 18th century, the church of the monastery began to function as the parish church of the city and in the late 19th century, it was elevated to the rank of a cathedral. Unlike many cathedrals in Mexico, this one does not face the city's main square, but rather is located just to the south, in its own walled compound, which it shares with a number of other structures. Unlike the other monastery structures from its time, the importance of this church provoked a number of renovation projects, the last of which occurred in 1957. This one took out the remaining older decorations of the interior and replaced them with simple modern ones. This renovation work also uncovered a 17th-century mural that covers 400 square metres (4,300 sq ft) of the interior walls and narrates the story of Philip of Jesus and twenty three other missionaries who were crucified in Japan.

== History ==
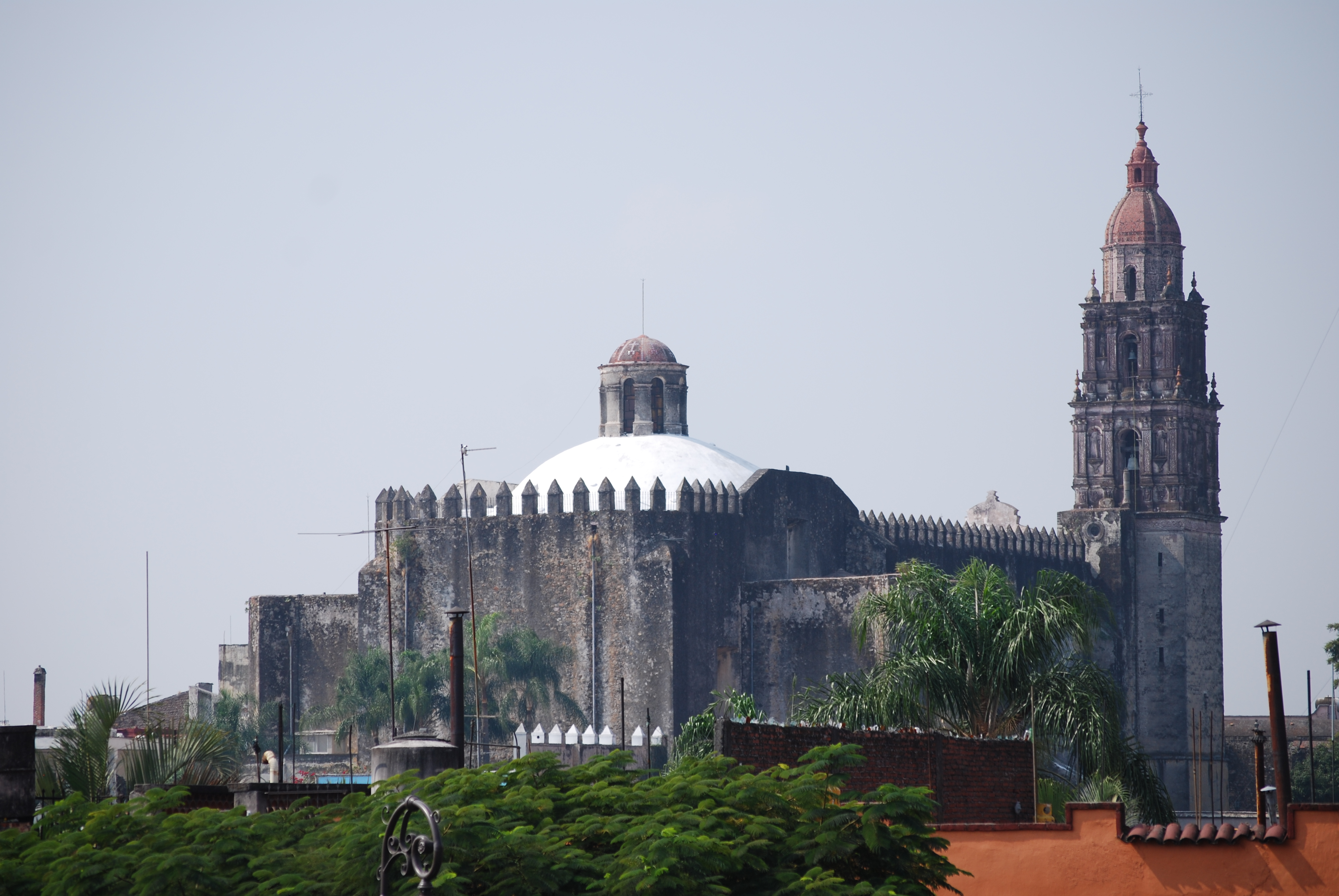
View of cathedral from behind showing defensive merlons

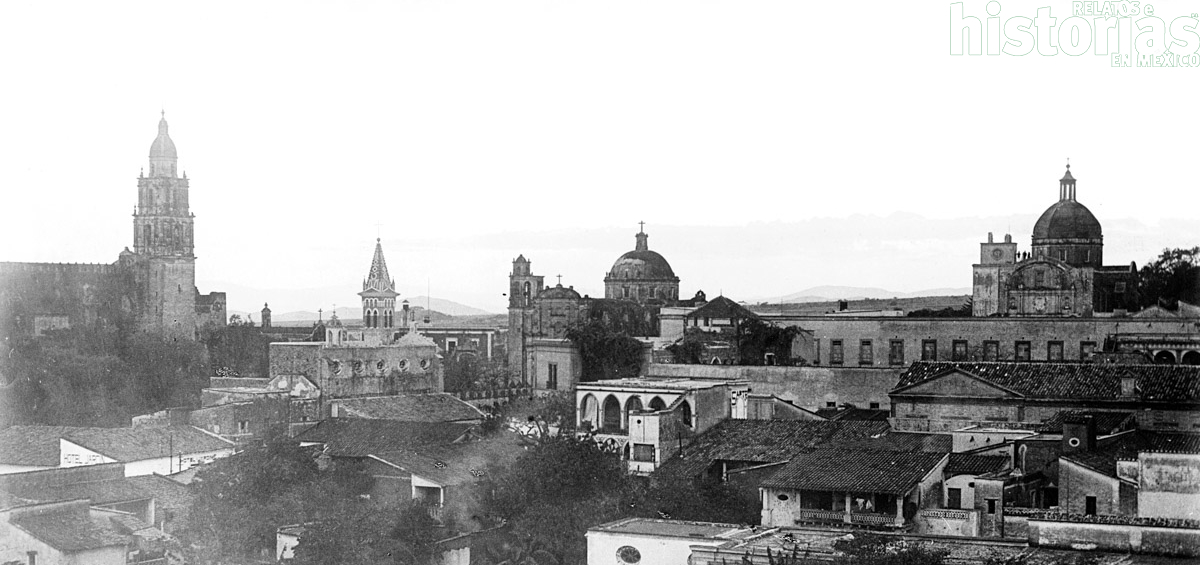
Cuernavaca cathedral and the city in 1893. Library of US Congress.

The church was part of the monastery of the Assumption of Mary of Cuernavaca (Spanish: monasterio de la Asunción de María). This monastery was one of number of large fortress-style monasteries which were built in the early 16th century in what is now northern Morelos and far western Puebla states, near the Popocatepetl volcano. These monasteries were built to evangelize and subdue the indigenous populations shortly after the Spanish conquest of the Aztec Empire. These monasteries began the evangelization effort which would spread south towards Oaxaca and Central America then later throughout the colony of New Spain. The organization of the Cuernavaca monastery was founded in 1525 by the first twelve Franciscans to arrive to the new Spanish colony, along with some newer arrivals. Among these were Antonio Maldonado, Antonio Ortiz, Alonso de Herrera and Diego de Almonte. The original purpose of the monastery organization was the evangelization of the local indigenous peoples, and later to house and train missionaries to other parts of New Spain. However, the main church and its walled atrium was originally off limits to all except the Spanish and indigenous nobles.

Building of the complex proper began in 1529 on land donated by Juana de Zúñiga de Cortés, Hernán Cortés's wife. It was the fifth construction in New Spain by the order and supervised by Toribio de Benavente Motolinia. Like other monasteries of the time, it was built with large, tall, thick walls and with merlons in order to defend the new missionaries from still hostile native peoples. The monastery's lands originally extended far beyond the current complex, and included large gardens and other lands used by the monks to produce food and other needed supplies.

The complex, including the church, was built in stages and modified starting from the 16th century. The year of 1532 is engraved in a monogram of the Virgin Mary at the north entrance, but it does not indicate the termination of this facade. It is most likely to have been finished by 1574. According to stories, a monk who died this year was accustomed to climbing onto the roof of the church to see how food reserves were, by checking crops drying on the roofs of indigenous homes. Visiting friar Alonso Ponce wrote in 1585 that the complex was finished and well constructed, and included the church, dormitory and gardens. This same monk notes the retirement and deaths of a number of older monks at the site. Most of the main church was finished by the late 17th century.

However, only the outer shell of the main church, along with the ground floor arches of the cloister remain from the earliest construction, due to subsequent remodeling projects. Over its history, this complex, especially the main church, was remodeled several times because of its importance to the evangelization efforts as well as its later importance as a parish church then Cathedral. Of the fourteen early monastery complexes recognized by the World Heritage organization, this is the only one which has experienced large scale changes since it was built.

In the 17th century, modifications were made to the church, beginning with the construction of two chapels to give it the layout of a Latin cross. The choir area, side altars and other parts were probably added at this time as well. In 1713, a vault similar to a cupola with a “liternilla” and a bell tower on the southeast corner were added to the structure. Unlike, previous work, which was austere, these were Baroque with the usual intricate decoration associated with it. At the foot of the tower, there is a clock. This clock was constructed by a Franciscan father for the Segovia Cathedral. In the 16th century, it was giving to Hernán Cortés by Charles V.

By the middle of the 18th century, interior modifications and additions made it heavily decorated with all types of religious art, including those made of silver and other costly materials. This was also the time that the main church of the monastery began to function as the parish church for the city of Cuernavaca.

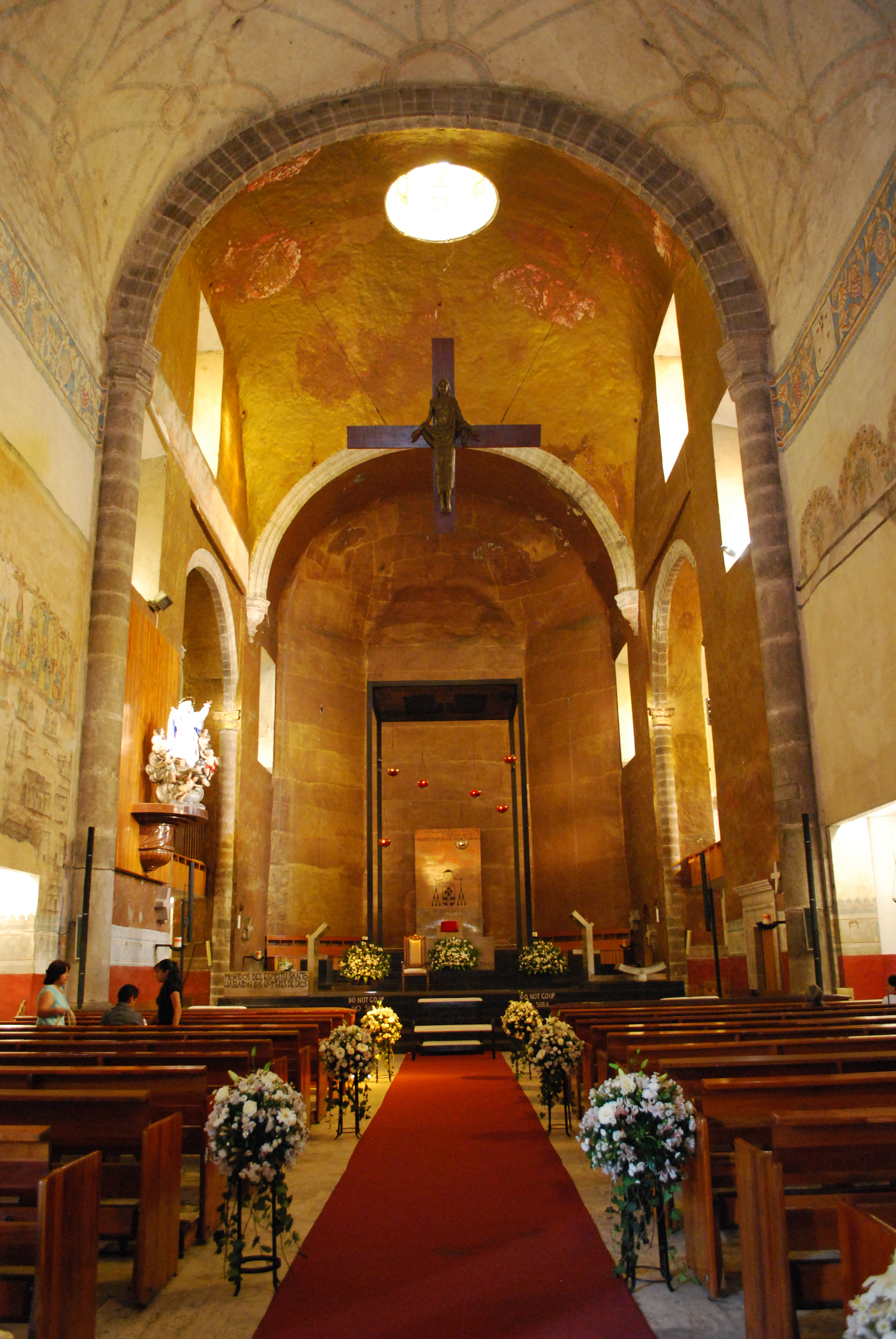
Main altar area showing rescued mural work and modern additions

The buildings and grounds of the monastery/parish remained the same until the latter 19th century, when the Reform Laws closed down and expropriated many monasteries and convents in Mexico. The La Asuncion de Maria monastery was closed and lost most of its lands and many of its buildings, leaving what remains to this day. One of the buildings formerly part of the complex is now the Robert Brady Museum. In 1882, an earthquake toppled the upper part of the tower. Reconstruction was ordered by Father Vicente Salinas y Riveras and supervised by José Gonzaléz Belauzaran.

In 1891, Pope Leo XIII established the Diocese of Cuernavaca, to administer over the territory of Morelos, converting the Parish of Nuestra Señora de la Asunción to the Cathedral of Cuernavaca. The first bishop was Fortino Hipólito Vera. In the early 20th century, part of the complex was taken over by Carranza-allied General Pablo González Garza to use as a headquarters during the Mexican Revolution.

By the middle of the 20th century, the church still had some of its former rich decor, including a gilded Churrigueresque main altar, along with two side altars with columns and capitals, along with wood sculpture of the Virgin Mary. One of these capitols is important as it relates to where the celebration of the first mass in Cuernavaca. However, in 1957 the Cathedral underwent another major remodeling by federal government. Some of the work consisted of restoring elements to their original condition. This included the cloister's cells, refectory, library and corridors. Some Baroque elements were added to the bell tower. But the major changes were made in the interior of the main church. The outer layers of plaster were removed, exposing mural work from the 18th century, which covers almost all of the walls of the main nave. This work tells the story of the martyrdom of Phillip of Jesus and other missionaries who were crucified in Nagasaki. The Churrigueresque altars and other older elements were mostly taken out and replaced with simple modern elements, especially in the main altar area. The older decorative items were placed in a pinacotheca on the premises but are not available to the public.

The cathedral complex became part of the Monasteries on the slopes of Popocatépetl World Heritage Site in 1994.

== Description ==
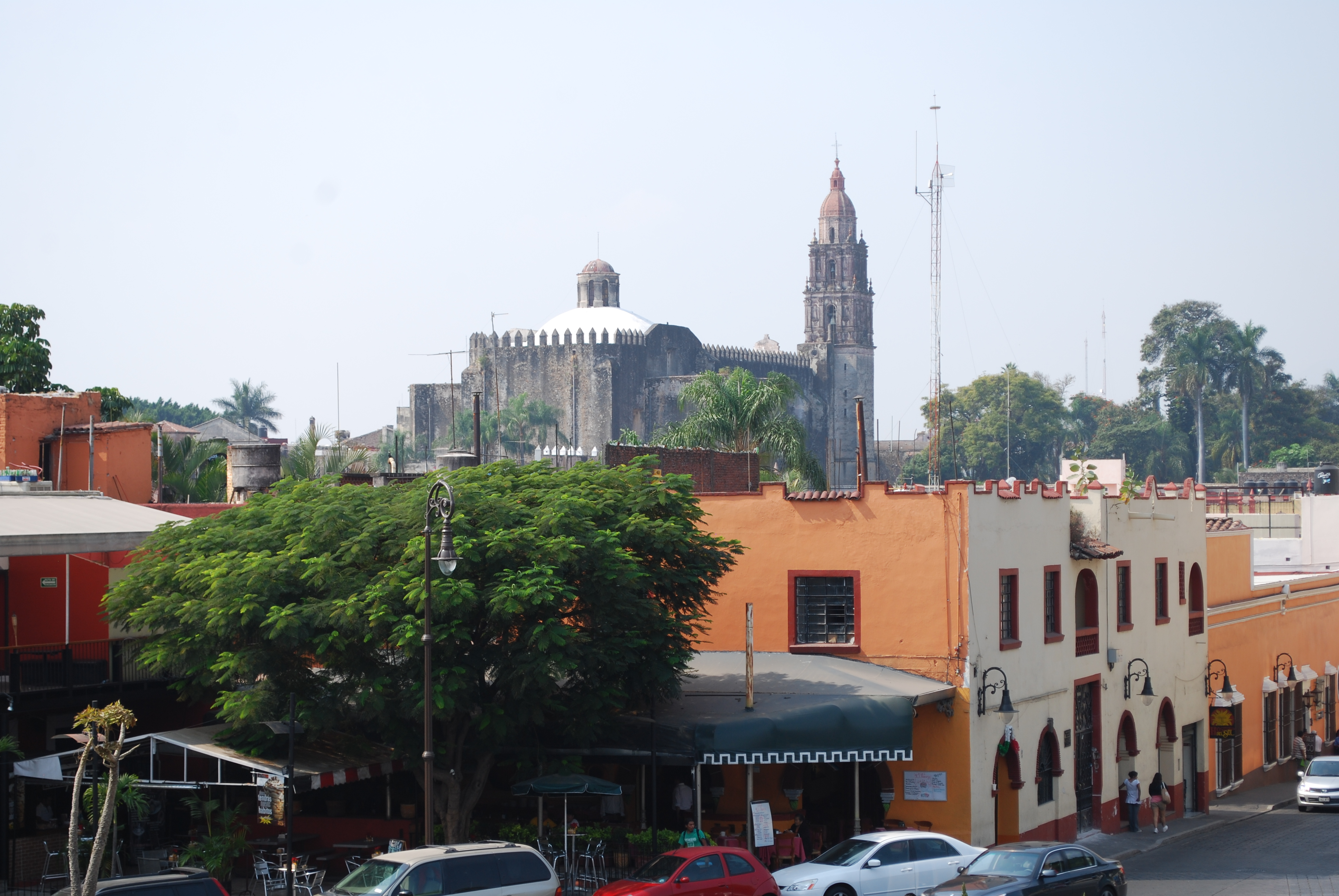
View of the cathedral from the Palace of Cortés in the center of the city

The cathedral complex is located in the historical center of the city of Cuernavaca, but unlike other Mexican cities, this most-important church is not on the main plaza but instead just south of it on the corner of Hidalgo and Morelos Streets. The complex consists of a walled compound with the main church, the cloister and several chapels/small churches. The main church and cloister are in the northeast part of the compound, with the other churches/chapels on the sides or corners. This forms the rest of the area or atrium into the shape of an L. This overall layout is the same as it was when it was originally built, although it is somewhat smaller due to subsequent construction. The overall form of this, which used to be only the inner sanctum of the monastery and its lands, was purposefully built away from the population center to give a sense of isolation to both the monks and those visiting. The atrium once functioned as a cemetery, but today it has trees and paths that connect the various elements. Near the center of the atrium is a stone cross on a base, which was probably created before the earliest of the compounds structures. The base is a square prism measuring 1.70 by 1.70 meters. According to some scholars, this is equivalent to a “cuauhxicalli” or stone used for human sacrifice. The use of this as the base was meant to show the triumph of Christianity over native beliefs. The cross proper is made of a single piece of sandstone. The atrium also contains a monument to the memory of “certain Spaniards who were murdered.”

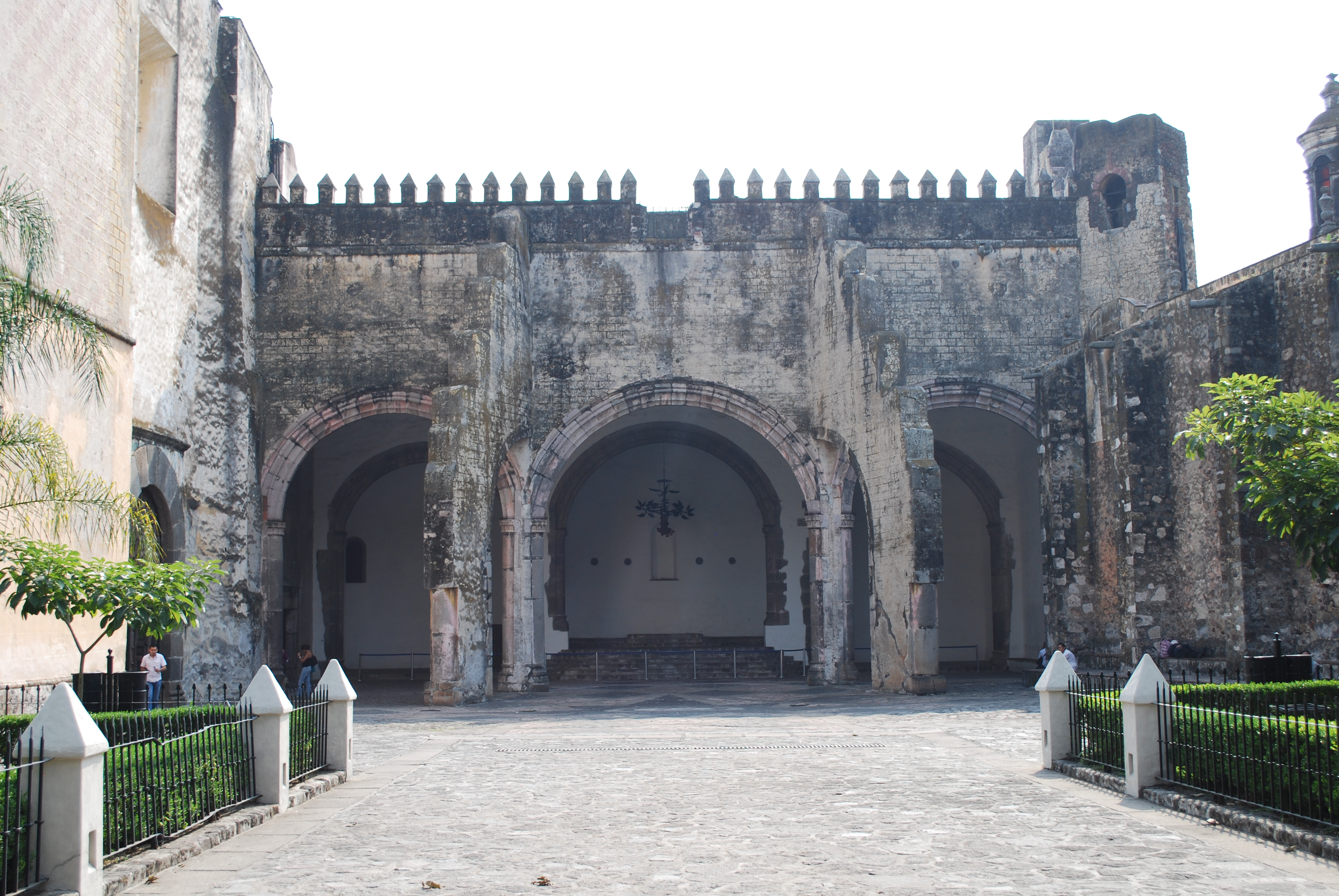
View of the San José capilla abierta

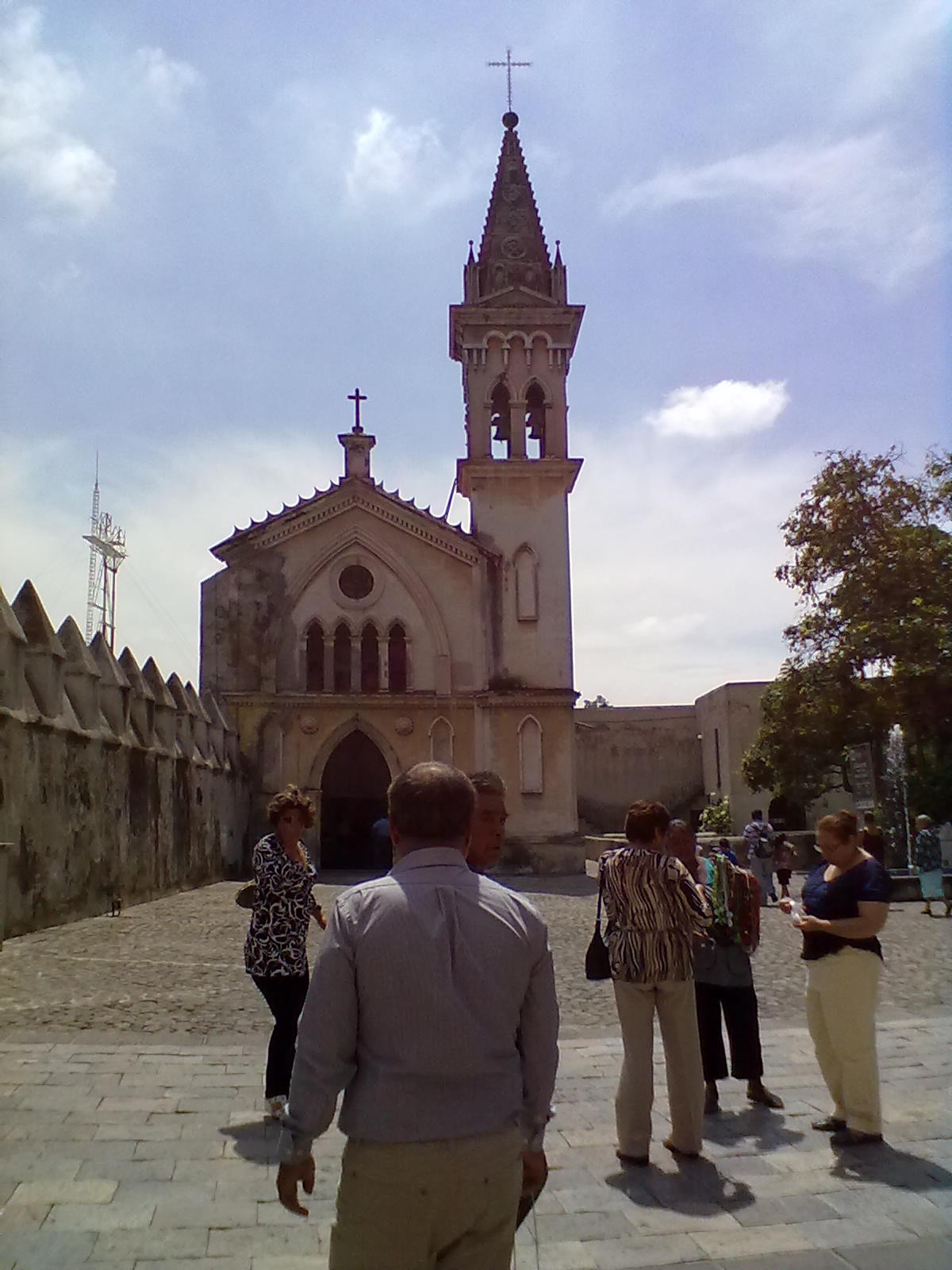
Chapel of Santa María

On the west side of the complex, on the south side of both the Cathedral itself and its attached cloister is the capilla abierta (open chapel). This was one of the first constructions of the Spanish built after Hernán Cortés choose Cuernavaca as a seat over his dominions. The chapel was originally bigger than what remains today. The open chapel here was used not only for Mass, but also for plays, music dance and other events designed to explain and reinforce the faith. The roof of the open chapel is supported by large arches and serves as a portico to the cloister. The cloister today is used as office for the bishopric. It was restored to its former look in the 20th century, with two levels surrounding a central courtyard. The levels have corridors marked off by arches. This cloister retains a number of frescos, some of which depict New Spain missionaries in the Philippines and Japan. The main church has a plain facade with the only element with ornate decoration is the bell tower with also contains a clock. Just inside the main portal, there is a bronze statue of Jesus carrying a cross, a lamb and a book. Just beyond this is a very large stone baptismal font. Inside, the decoration is stark and mostly modern, especially in the main altar area. An equilateral cross with an image of Christ is suspended over the altar area and there are small modern crosses and other elements on the side walls. However, the most important decorative element is an 18th-century narrative mural. This mural was uncovered during the renovation work in the mid 20th century. The mural covers 400 m² of both side walls of the main nave of the church and tells the story of the arrival and martyrdom of Philip of Jesus and other missionaries in Japan. The mural was probably painted in the middle of the 17th century after the Franciscan missionaries were beatified in 1627. The mural was painted al fresco in a primitive style. Little is known about who painted it or the socio-political context behind its creation. One scholar by the name of Luis Islas Garcia, believes that the artist was a native of Asia who resided in the monastery, assisted by local indigenous people. However, Father Diego Yuki of a museum dedicated to the martyrs in Nagasaki believes that the mural as a purely local work. Phillip of Jesus was beatified in 1627, and canonized in 1629. As the first Mexican saint, as well as a Franciscan, his story would have importance at this establishment. He would have relevance through the colonial period as a symbol of Criollo identity in Mexico. However, this mural was covered over in the 19th century and its existence was forgotten. The work was rediscovered in the 20th century by architect Ricardo Robina when the cathedral was remodeled.

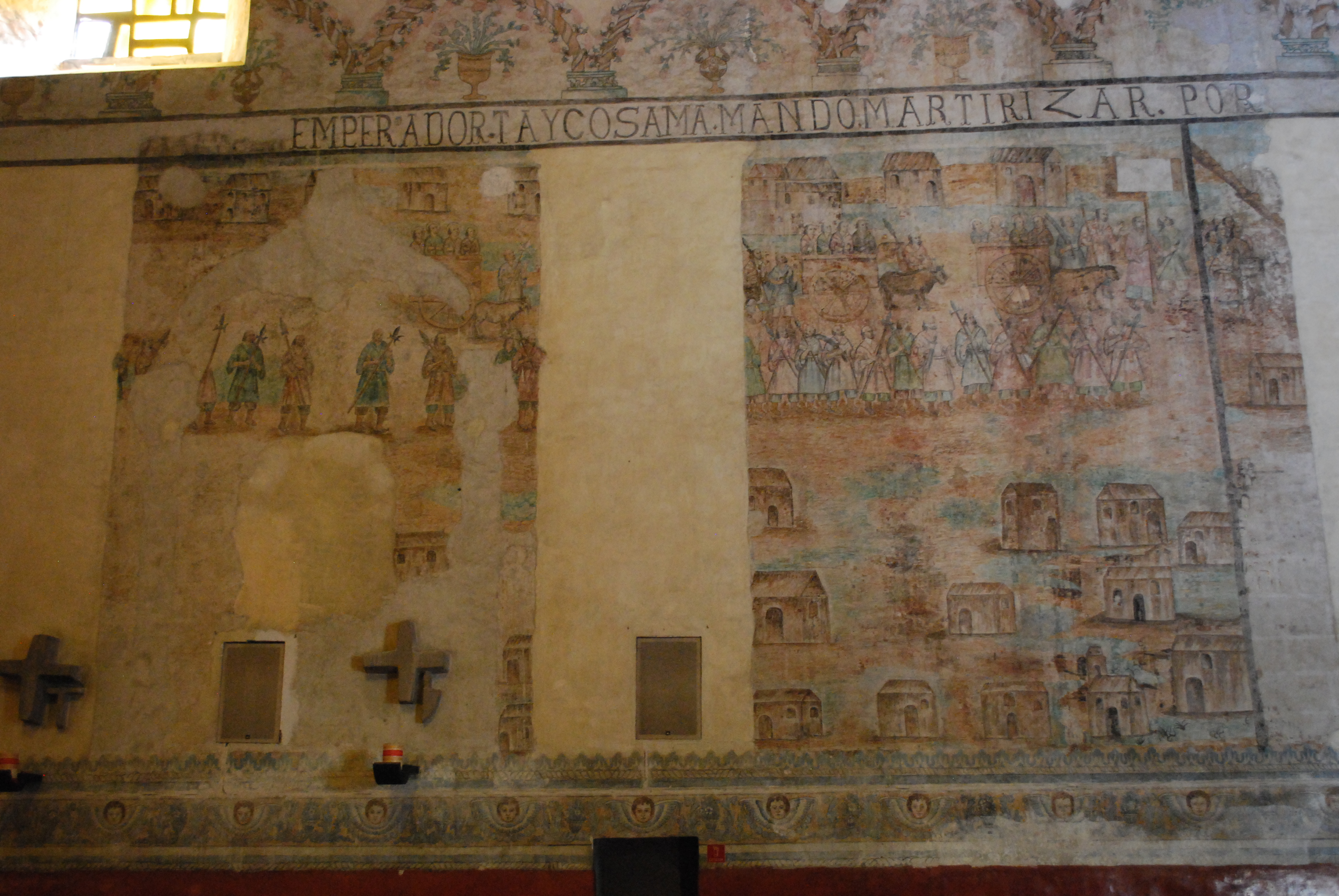
Portion of mural work inside the church.

The story of the mural begins with Pope Innocence II blessing the 23 missionaries, who later arrived to Japan from the Philippines. There scenes of the twenty three; 16 Japanese and five Spaniards performing missionary work in Kyoto. Then it shows the group in caged carts accompanied by soldiers as they are taken to Nagasaki. The 24th martyr is Phillip of Jesus, who was shipwrecked in Japan. The emperor of Japan, Toyotomi Hideyoshi, offered to spare his life as he had not preached Christianity, but Philip refused and was crucified with the others. For this, he would be canonized as a saint. One legend says that on the day of his death, a fig tree in the family's orchards in Mexico came back to life.

The complex also contains pinacotheca or art storage room with archeological pieces as well as paintings and other artworks from the 16th to the 19th centuries. This collection is the result of a number of people but it is considered to have been begun by Francisco Plancarte y Navarrete, the second bishop of Cuernavaca. His personal collection of pre-Hispanic artifacts and rare examples of religious art became part of a historical museum house in two rooms of the Episcopal Palace. Later more religious objects, tapestries and more were added up to the present day.

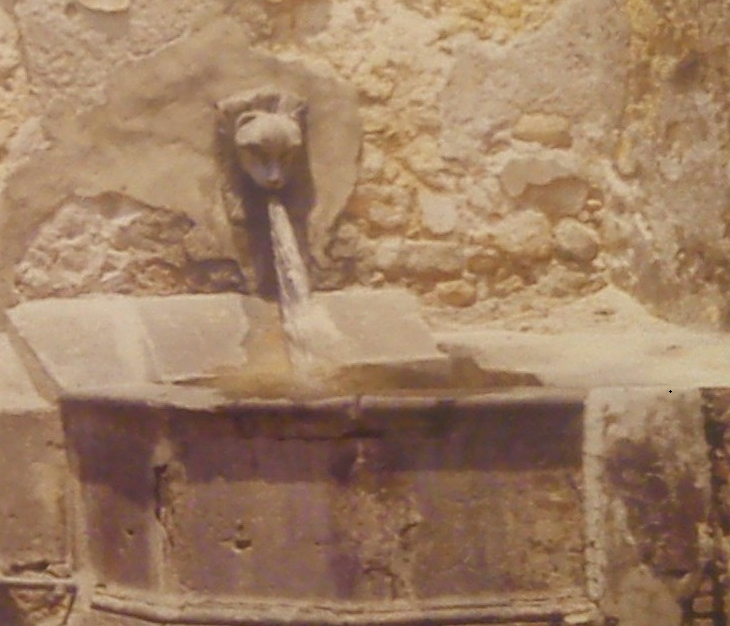
A gargoyle throws water in a fountain on the west stone wall of the Cuernavaca Cathedral

By 1987, this collection was stored in less-than-optimal conditions at the Cathedral complex. Efforts by Juan Dubernard Chavenau, a textile manufacturer and others such as a Mexican project called “Adopt a Work of Art” eventually convinced the INAH to build more suitable facilities at the complex. It also worked to completely restore the 58 religious paintings in the collection. One series of paintings of particular importance is called the Apostolado... twelve paintings depicting each of the Apostles. This group is one of only three of its kind in Mexico. Other paintings include Ia "Estigmatización de San Francisco de Asís" from the 16th century, a relief which is probably from the original main altar of the church which depicts Saint Francis kneeling receiving the stigmata. Others include "La natividad de Ia Virgen María" and “San Francisco Javier” from the 17th century, “La última cena” from the 18th century and "Jesús calma Ia tormenta" by Rafael Flores in the 19th century.

== The chapels ==
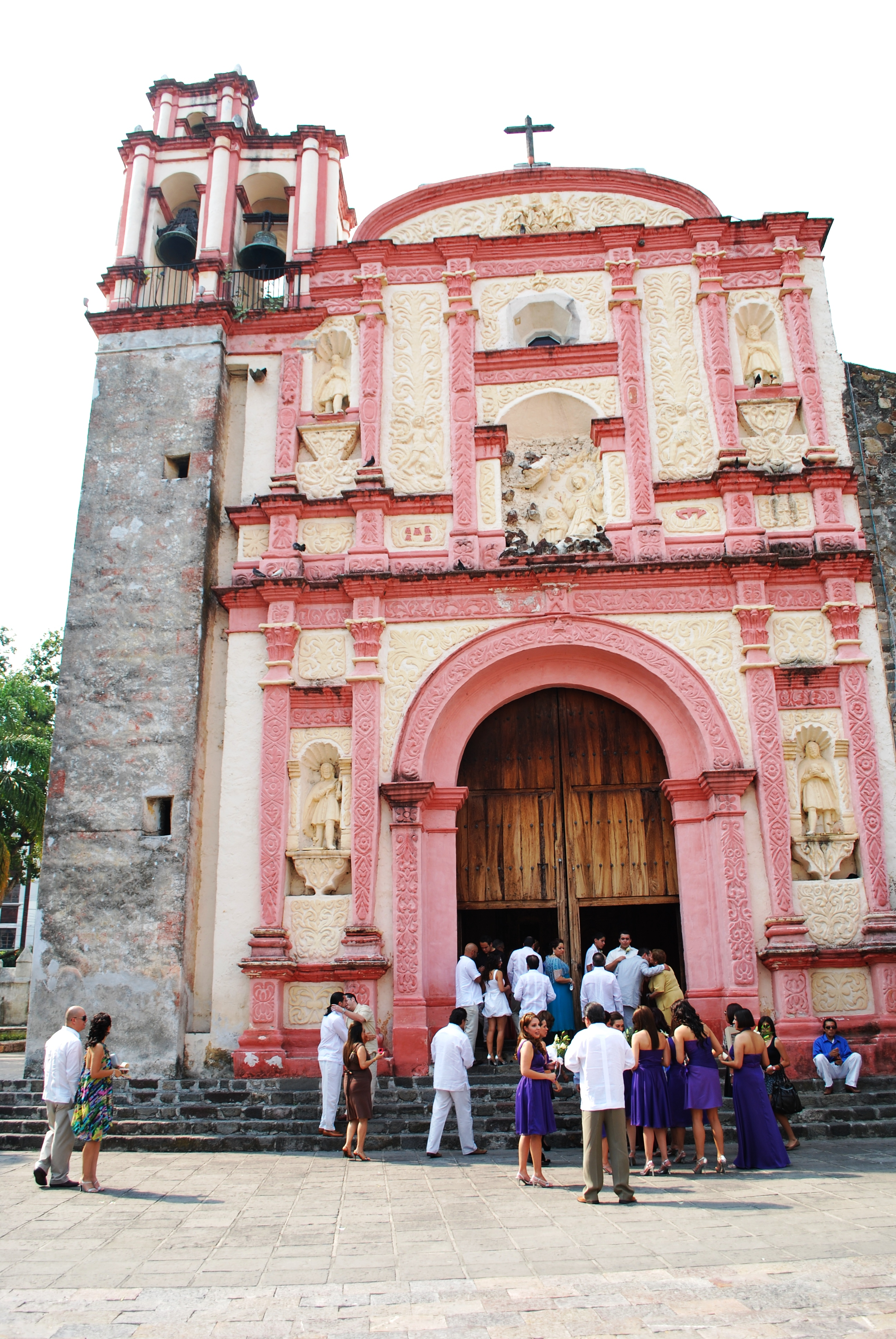
The facade of the Tercera Orden Chapel

The most important of the other chapels in the complex is the capilla abierta (open chapel) which is dedicated to Saint Joseph. This structure is one of many built in Mexico in the first half of the 16th century in monasteries, and were usually meant for the saying of mass and other religious activities associated with the mass conversion of the native population at that time. It is possible that Hernán Cortés had this particular chapel built during the time he lived in Cuernavaca. To construct it, native workers were conscripted from a number of villages around Cuernavaca including de Tletlama, Cuentepec, Miacatla, Temixco, San Francisco Coatlán, Mazatepec, San Miguel Coatlán, Cuauchichinola, Huajitlán, Panchimalco, Tlatenchi, Huitzila, Coajomulco, Ocotepec, Temilpa, Santa María Ahuecatitla, Tetela y Tlaltenango. Unlike many other capillas, this one is a parallel with the axis of the church instead of perpendicular. There are no precedents for this layout either in Mexico or Spain. It is also the portico of the cloister area, the first of its kind in Mexico. It was built this way so that it would back the walled atrium area. The capilla was damaged in the earthquake of 1882. It appears that repairs at this time replaced the original crest. In the interior of the capilla, over the portal of the cloister there is a mural of the "Spiritual lineage of Saint Francis of Assisi". It represents the life of the founder of the Franciscan order than the saints that it produced. This mural is deteriorated. Today, the open chapel is frequently used for weddings.

The next most important chapel in the complex is the Tercera Orden Chapel (Capilla de la Tercera Orden), built the northwest corner of the complex in 1722 by Enrique de Jeres, a Franciscan friar. It would later have a seminary installed in one of its annexes by the first bishop of Cuernavaca, which would become one of the most important educational institutions in the city in the 19th century. This chapel was constructed in a style called popular Baroque along with Churriguersque. The facade has sculptures of angels and saints, some with indigenous headdresses. The bell tower has two levels but it is not tall. The portal on the south side is topped with a seashell formation. Inside, it has a Latin cross layout with one name, divided into an upper choir, nave and apse. The main altar is Baroque, profusely decorated with colorful flowers, angel and saints. This altar was constructed by indigenous craftsmen.

The other two large chapels on the site are the Nuestra Señora de los Dolores Chapel and the Santa Cruz Chapel. The first is one of the oldest structures in the compound, constructed before the main church. The Santa Cruz Chapel in Neogothic style, and honors the Our Lady of Mount Carmel.

== Museum of Religious Art ==
The Museo de Arte Sacro (Museum of Religious Art), which entrance is located in the southwest corner of the church complex, was opened by Bishop Ramón Castro Castro on July 12, 2018. Built at a cost of MXN $36.3 million (U.S. $2 million), the museum houses 92 paintings, sculptures, vestments, and other pieces dating from the 16th to the 21st century.

The first room is dedicated to Catholic liturgy and includes La Diosa Tonantzin, a fertility goddess discovered beneath the main altar as well as priestly vestments and other liturgical objects and paintings. The second room is dedicated to St. Francis of Assisi including Estigmatización de San Francisco (Stigmatization of San Francisco) by Andrés de la Concha (late 16th century). The third relates to the evangelization of Mexico, with emphasis on Our Lady of Guadalupe. El Señor de Chalma con Florones (Lord of Chalma with Rosettes) and La Resurrección de Cristo (The Resurrection of Christ), attributed to José de Ibarra in the 18th century, are found here. Juan Correa is represented by El Nacimiento de la Virgen (Birth of the Virgin) and La Educación de la Virgen (Education of the Virgin). Simon Pereyns is represented by La Crucifixión (The Crucifixion). An entrance fee is charged.

== See also ==
- Monasteries on the slopes of Popocatépetl
- Mendicant monasteries in Mexico
- Atrial cross
