= Policy Sam =

American gambler (1858–1937)

- Born: Samuel Young; 1858; Huntsville, Alabama, US
- Died: 1937 (aged 78–79); Chicago, Illinois, US
- Burial place: Louisville, Kentucky, US
- Occupations: Gambler; businessman
- Years active: 1885–1937
- Known for: Starting the policy game in Chicago
- Spouse: Ada Miller
- Children: 9

Samuel "Policy Sam" Young (1858–1937) was an American gambler, who is often credited as one of the initiators of the policy game in Chicago, starting from 1885. He was aided for his objective by a white gambler named Patsy King. For his association with the game, he was popularly known by his nicknames "Policy Sam" and "The Father of Policy", and became one of the most popular Chicagoan gamblers at the time, though it initially was not very popular. His policy game was popularized by the gambler John "Mushmouth" Johnson.

== Biography ==
Samuel Young was born in 1858 in Huntsville, Alabama. According to Ron Chepesiuk, much details about his early life remain unknown. His mother died when Young was six years old, and one of his aunts took him to Memphis, Tennessee, where she raised him. In Young's early life, he had a passion for baseball, and in his late teens became a player associated with various teams in the South. He learned how to play the numbers game while staying on riverboats that traveled on the Mississippi river.

When Young was twenty-one years old, he went to Columbus, Ohio, and stayed there for five or six years. He then used to move back and forth Columbus and Chicago. He met Ada Miller in Columbus and they married in Louisville, Kentucky, after which they moved to southern Chicago. He bought a house at Twenty-ninth and Federal streets located in Chicago's Southside. He had nine children in his family. According to Chepesiuk, Young was a strong believer in education and encouraged his children to finish college. One of his daughters graduated from Wilberforce University and was working in a Chicago law firm after Young's death. One of his sons graduated from the same university, having a position in Washington, D. C. after Young's death, which he stated was because of Young's relations with congressman named Arthur Mitchell. He started the policy game in Chicago after arriving from New Orleans, Louisiana. In his gambling business, Young had his own system in which he did not allow too many people to be present at the time of the drawing of the numbers, and also moved the location every day.

He was financially aided by a white gambler named Patsy King, who was the owner of Bucket Shop Saloon on Harrison Street. He also became a bail bondsman and developed relations with political persons. Later, Young opened a shop near Clark Street and Madison Street, and also had a place where the numbers were drawn on an elevated station at Thirty-first and State streets. Chepesiuk writes that he did not have too much money on his hands at times, which resulted in him sometimes being unable to pay the winning bets. Charlie Jones, a black Chicagoan gambler, stated that Young on average lost US$100 per day during World War I even with his large income.

In 1905, black gambler John "Mushmouth" Johnson refused gambler Bob Motts to enter his businesses. Motts along with congressman Edward Green passed an anti-policy law in 1905, which resulted in Young and others having to temporarily withdraw from their businesses. The policy game was upheld during his withdrawal by Johnson until his death in 1907. Young during this time signed bonds for small court offenders as his income. In 1915, Young introduced his policy game to the black community on South State Street, resuming his businesses. Later, Young explained the game to tavern owners Julius Benvenuti and Caesar Benvenuti, who worked together to open a policy wheel in Chicago named the Blue Racer, and appointed Young as the headman. He increased his income by supervising lottery games located in various parts of Chicago and nearby areas.

In the early 1920s, Julius Benvenuti provided financial support to him, allowing Young to open the Interstate and Springfield Policy Company located at 2900 La Salle Street, which became one of the largest Chicagoan policy businesses at the time. He reportedly earned between US$3,000 and US$4,000 from this business. In 1923, Young entered several disputes with the Chicago police, which was made during one of their periodical raids on gambling businesses. The police used axes and sledgehammers to break down the doors, after which they shot two black people who had come to gamble, killing one of them. Other police turned up later to control the situation. Young often made little money from his enterprises throughout his career from here, and his policy shops often failed to turn up profits. In 1926, he lost around US$10,000 (equivalent to $181,861 in 2025) in the Chicago race track bets, which he had picked up as one of his hobbies besides nightclubs and poker.

In 1930, Interstate and Springfield Policy Company and other of his gambling businesses were closed for nine months, owing to problems raised around gambling. When the operations were resumed in late 1931, Young had many financial difficulties, and he was later taken back into the company by Julius Benvenuti. Young died in 1937 in Chicago, being bankrupt at his death.

His funeral was held, and Young was buried in Louisville in Kentucky. Julius Benvenuti and his brother Leo Benvenuti gave money for arranging his funeral. Other policy gamblers and businessmen from Chicago sent flowers. Charlie Jones remarked Young as a "man who gave away a fortune and never refused any man a dime".

== Philanthropy ==
According to author Ron Chepesiuk, Young "was a generous man" and did not hesitate to give away money despite his losses. He provided financial help to members of the Great Lakes Lodge of the Elks whenever there were problems in funds. His philanthropy and generosity efforts led other gamblers who made fortunes from the policy game to give away money to communities. Young also aided minor gamblers in Chicago by his job as a bail bondsman, from which he earned reputation as a "fixer" throughout the black community.

== See also ==
- Theodore Roe
- Jesse Binga
- Robert T. Motts
