= 1907 =

1907 in various calendars
- Gregorian calendar: 1907; MCMVII
- Ab urbe condita: 2660
- Armenian calendar: 1356; ԹՎ ՌՅԾԶ
- Assyrian calendar: 6657
- Baháʼí calendar: 63–64
- Balinese saka calendar: 1828–1829
- Bengali calendar: 1313–1314
- Berber calendar: 2857
- British Regnal year: 6 Edw. 7 – 7 Edw. 7
- Buddhist calendar: 2451
- Burmese calendar: 1269
- Byzantine calendar: 7415–7416
- Chinese calendar: 丙午年 (Fire Horse); 4604 or 4397 — to — 丁未年 (Fire Goat); 4605 or 4398
- Coptic calendar: 1623–1624
- Discordian calendar: 3073
- Ethiopian calendar: 1899–1900
- Hebrew calendar: 5667–5668
- Hindu calendars
- Vikram Samvat: 1963–1964
- Shaka Samvat: 1828–1829
- Kali Yuga: 5007–5008
- Holocene calendar: 11907
- Igbo calendar: 907–908
- Iranian calendar: 1285–1286
- Islamic calendar: 1324–1325
- Japanese calendar: Meiji 40 (明治４０年)
- Javanese calendar: 1836–1837
- Julian calendar: Gregorian minus 13 days
- Korean calendar: 4240
- Minguo calendar: 5 before ROC 民前5年
- Nanakshahi calendar: 439
- Thai solar calendar: 2449–2450
- Tibetan calendar: མེ་ཕོ་རྟ་ལོ་ (male Fire-Horse); 2033 or 1652 or 880 — to — མེ་མོ་ལུག་ལོ་ (female Fire-Sheep); 2034 or 1653 or 881

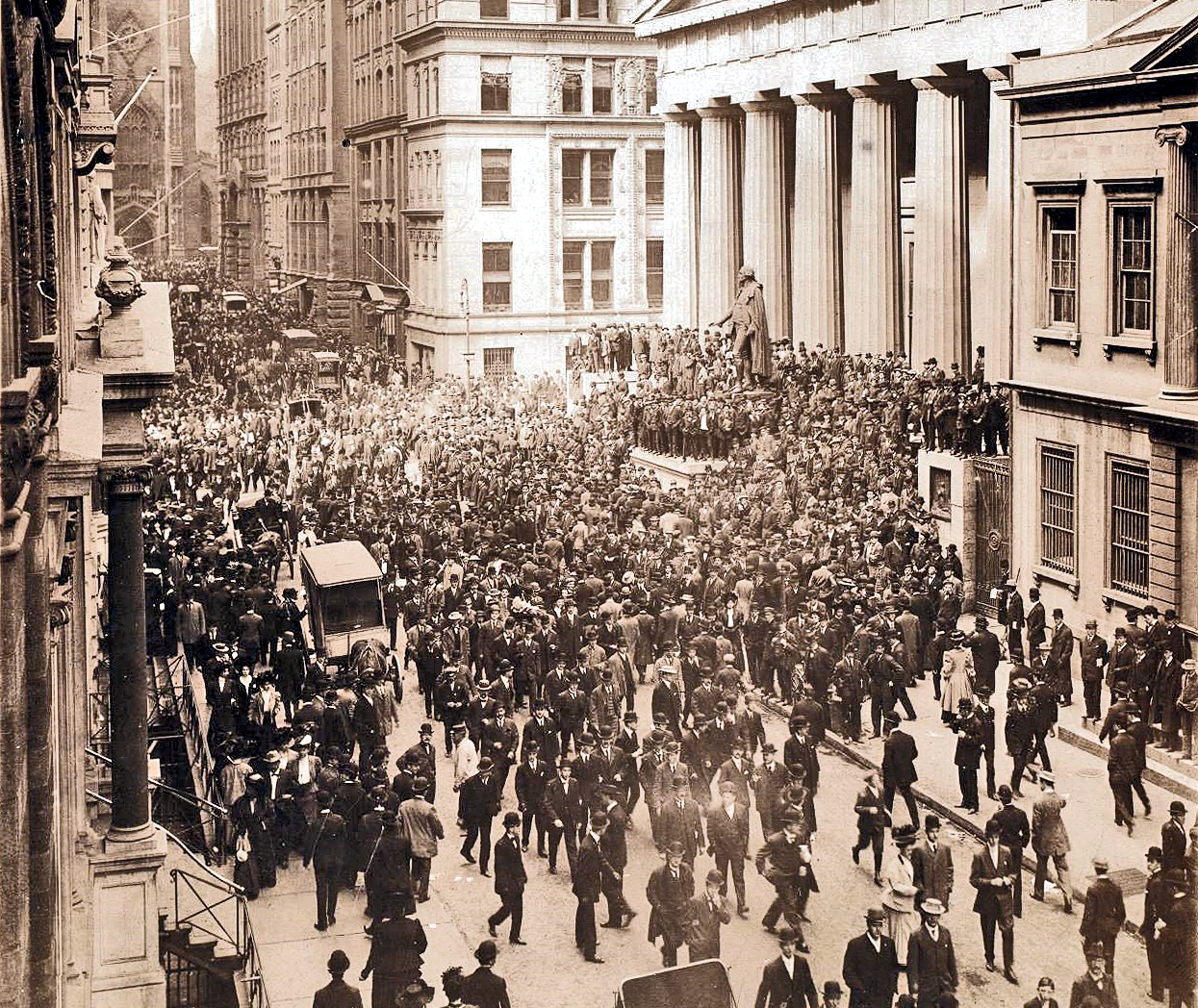
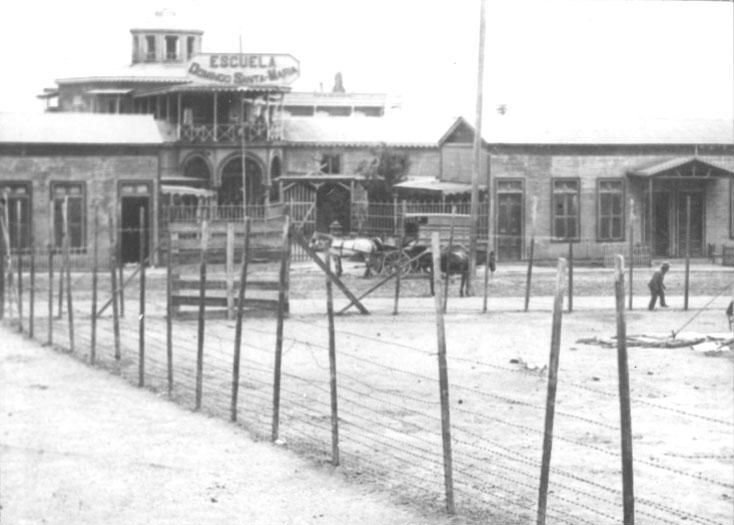
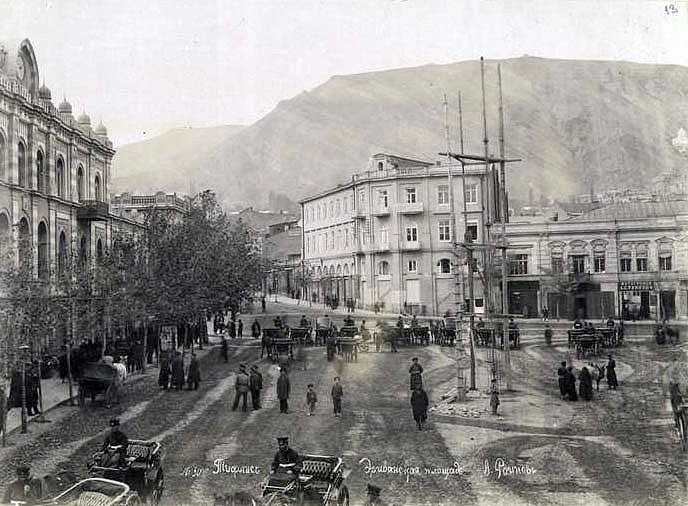
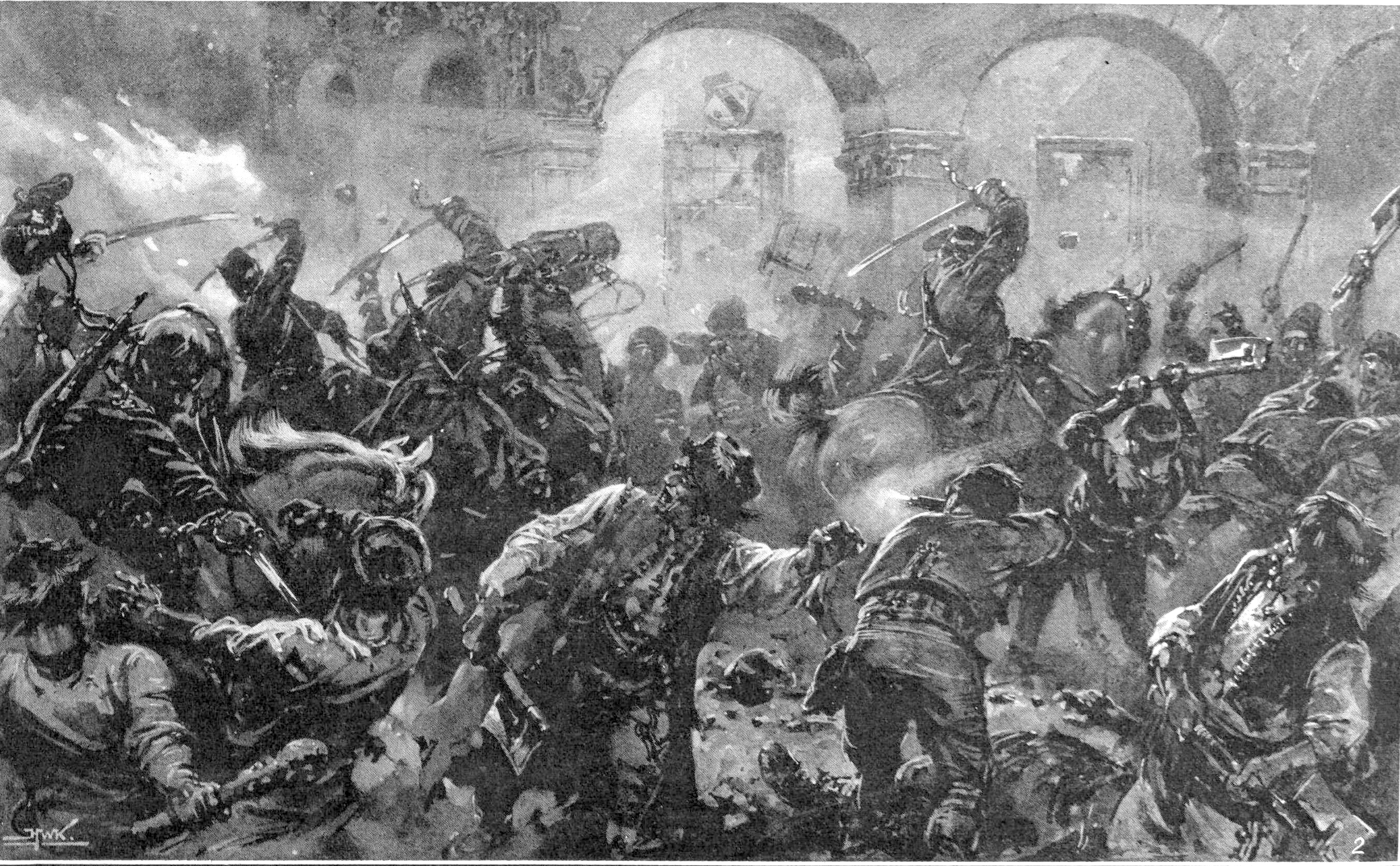
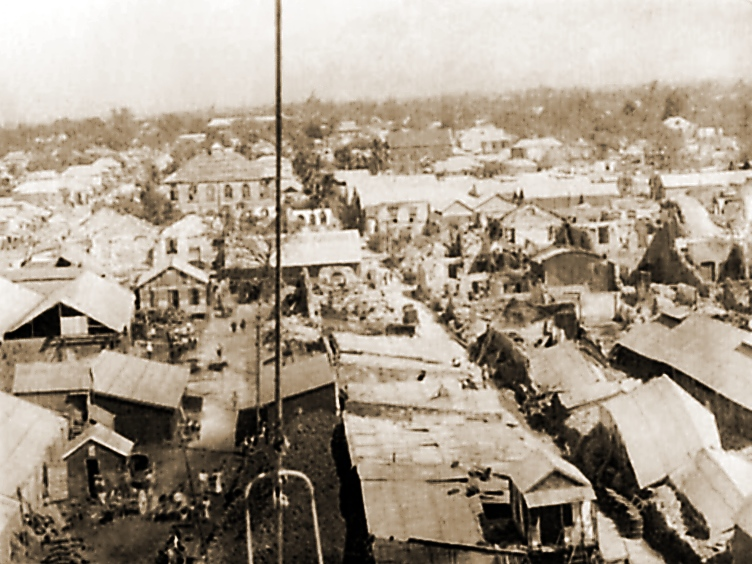
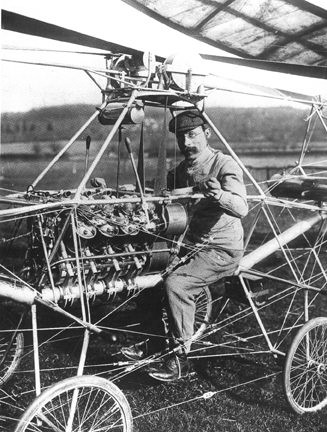
From top to bottom, left to right:
- The Panic of 1907 triggers a U.S. financial crisis, sparking bank runs and paving the way for the Federal Reserve;
- The Santa María School massacre in Chile sees government troops kill hundreds of striking nitrate workers and their families;
- The 1907 Tiflis bank robbery by Bolsheviks shocks the Russian Empire and funds revolutionaries;
- The vast 1907 Romanian Peasants' Revolt erupts against landlords, ending in brutal crackdowns and thousands dead;
- The 1907 Kingston earthquake devastates Jamaica’s capital, killing more than 800;
- The Cornu helicopter achieves the first free flight in France, a milestone in aviation.

1907 (MCMVII) was a common year starting on Tuesday of the Gregorian calendar and a common year starting on Monday of the Julian calendar, the 1907th year of the Common Era (CE) and Anno Domini (AD) designations, the 907th year of the 2nd millennium, the 7th year of the 20th century, and the 8th year of the 1900s decade. As of the start of 1907, the Gregorian calendar was 13 days ahead of the Julian calendar, which remained in localized use until 1923.

Cohort extinction took place on 19th of August 2024 when the last surviving person born in 1907, Maria Branyas, died at the age of 117 years, 168 days.

== Events ==
=== January ===
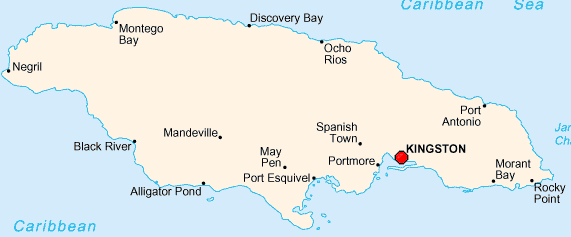
January 14: Earthquake in Jamaica

- January 14 – 1907 Kingston earthquake: A 6.5 M_{w} earthquake in Kingston, Jamaica, kills between 800 and 1,000.

=== February ===
- February 9 – The "Mud March", the first large procession organised by The National Union of Women's Suffrage Societies (NUWSS), takes place in London.
- February 11 – The French warship Jean Bart sinks off the coast of Morocco.
- February 12 – The steamship Larchmont collides with the Harry Hamilton in Long Island Sound; 183 lives are lost.
- February 16 – SKF, a worldwide mechanical parts manufacturing brand is founded in Gothenburg, Sweden.
- February 21 – The English mail steamship Berlin is wrecked off the Hook of Holland; 142 lives are lost.
- February 24 – The Austrian Lloyd steamship Imperatrix, from Trieste to Bombay, is wrecked on Cape of Crete and sinks; 137 lives are lost.

=== March ===
- March
  - The steamship Congo collides at the mouth of the Ems River with the German steamship Nerissa; 7 lives are lost.
  - The 1907 Romanian Peasants' Revolt results in possibly as many as 11,000 deaths.
  - The Diamond Sūtra, a woodblock printed Buddhist scripture dated 868, is discovered by Aurel Stein in the Mogao Caves in China; it is "the earliest complete survival of a dated printed book".
  - Pablo Picasso completes his painting Les Demoiselles d'Avignon.
- March 11 – The Prime Minister of Bulgaria, Dimitar Petkov, is assassinated by an anarchist in Sofia.
- March 15–16 – Elections to the new Parliament of Finland are the first in the world for a national assembly with woman candidates, as well as the first elections in Europe where universal suffrage is applied; 19 women are elected.
- March 22 – The first taxicabs with taximeters begin operating in London.
- March 25 – The first university sports federation in Europe is established in Hungary, with the participation or support of the associations of ten universities and colleges.
- c. March 28 – The volcano Ksudach erupts, in the Kamchatka Peninsula.

=== April ===
- April 7 – Hershey Park opens in Hershey, Pennsylvania.
- April 17 – The first Minas Geraes-class battleship is laid down for Brazil, by Armstrong Whitworth on the River Tyne, in England, triggering the South American dreadnought race.
- April 24 – Al Ahly SC is founded in Cairo by Omar Lotfi, as a gathering place for Egyptian students' unions in the struggle against colonization; it is the first association football club officially founded in Egypt or Africa.

=== May ===
- May 13 – The 5th Congress of the Russian Social Democratic Labour Party convenes in secret in London.

=== June ===
- June 5 – Shastri Yagnapurushdas consecrates the murtis of both Sahajanand Swami and Gunatitanand Swami in a single central shrine, thus establishing the Bochasanwasi Shri Akshar Purushottam Swaminarayan Sanstha, later a United Nations affiliate organization.
- June 6 – Persil laundry detergent is first marketed by Henkel of Düsseldorf, Germany, the first to combine bleach with detergent commercially.
- June 10–August 10 – The Peking to Paris motor race is won by Prince Scipione Borghese, driving a 7-litre 35/45 hp Itala.
- June 15 – The Second Hague Peace Conference opens at The Hague.
- June 22 – The London Underground's Charing Cross, Euston and Hampstead Railway opens.
- June 26 – Tiflis bank robbery: Bolsheviks attack a cash-filled bank coach in the centre of Tiflis, Georgia, killing 40 people.

=== July ===
- July 1 – The Orange River Colony gains autonomy, as the Orange Free State.
- July 6 – Guardians of the Irish Crown Jewels notice that they have been stolen.
- July 15 – The London Electrobus Company starts running the first ever service of battery-electric buses between London's Victoria Station and Liverpool Street.
- July 21 – The SS Columbia sinks after colliding with the lumber schooner San Pedro, off Shelter Cove, California, resulting in 88 deaths.
- July 24 – The Japan–Korea Treaty of 1907 brings the government and military of the protectorate of Korea more firmly under Japanese control.

=== August ===
- August 24–31 – The International Anarchist Congress of Amsterdam meets in the Netherlands.
- August 28 – UPS is founded by James E. (Jim) Casey in Seattle, Washington.
- August 29 – The partially completed superstructure of the Quebec Bridge collapses entirely, claiming the lives of 76 workers.
- August 31 – Count Alexander Izvolsky and Sir Arthur Nicolson sign the Anglo-Russian Entente in Saint Petersburg, bringing a pause in The Great Game in Central Asia, and establishing the Triple Entente.

=== September ===
- September 7 – British Cunard Line passenger liner RMS Lusitania sets out on her maiden voyage, from Liverpool (England) to New York City.
- September 8 – Pope Pius X promulgates the encyclical Pascendi Dominici gregis, opposing modernism in the Catholic Church.
- September 22 – Uruguay abolishes capital punishment.
- September 26 – New Zealand and Newfoundland become dominions of the British Empire.

=== October ===
- October – A committee of the Delegation for the Adoption of an International Auxiliary Language, made up of academics including Otto Jespersen, Wilhelm Ostwald and Roland Eötvös, meet in Paris to select a language for international use. The committee ultimately decides to reform Esperanto.
- October 6 – The Deutscher Werkbund is founded in Germany.
- October 17 – Guglielmo Marconi initiates commercial transatlantic radio communications between his high power longwave wireless telegraphy stations in Clifden, Ireland, and Glace Bay, Nova Scotia.
- October 18 – The Hague Convention is revised by the (second) Hague Peace Conference (effective 26 January 1910), focussing on naval warfare.
- October 24 – A major United States financial crisis is averted when J. P. Morgan, E. H. Harriman, James Stillman, Henry Clay Frick and other Wall Street financiers create a $25,000,000 pool to invest in the shares on the plunging New York Stock Exchange, ending the bank panic of 1907.
- October 27 – Černová massacre: Fifteen people are shot during the consecration of a Catholic church in Hungary (modern-day Slovakia).

=== November ===
- November 16
  - British Cunard Line passenger liner RMS Mauretania, the world's largest and fastest at this date, sets out on her maiden voyage from Liverpool to New York.
  - President Theodore Roosevelt proclaims that Oklahoma has become the 46th U.S. state.

=== December ===
- December 6 – Monongah Mining disaster: A coal mine explosion kills 362 workers in Monongah, West Virginia.
- December 14 – The largest sailing ship ever built, the 7-masted U.S.-owned Thomas W. Lawson, is wrecked in the Isles of Scilly.
- December 16 – The American Great White Fleet begins its circumnavigation of the world.
- December 17 – Ugyen Wangchuck becomes the first Druk Gyalpo (king of Bhutan).
- December 19 – An explosion in a coal mine in Jacobs Creek, Pennsylvania kills 239.
- December 21 – Santa María School massacre: In Chile, soldiers fire at striking mineworkers gathered in the Santa María School in Iquique; over 2,000 are killed.

=== Date unknown ===
- Indiana, in the United States, becomes the world's first legislature to place laws permitting compulsory sterilization for eugenic purposes on the statute book.
- The triode thermionic amplifier invented by Lee de Forest, starting the development of electronics as a practical technology.
- The Autochrome Lumière is the first commercial color photography process.
- James M. Spangler invents the first Hoover vacuum cleaner.
- The Moine Thrust Belt in Scotland is identified, one of the first to be discovered anywhere.

== Births ==
=== January ===
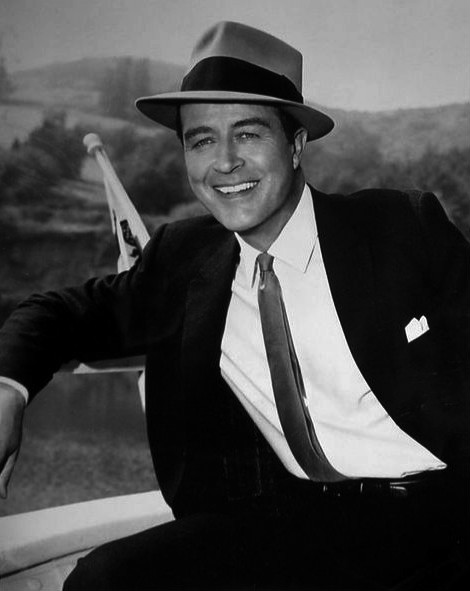
Ray Milland

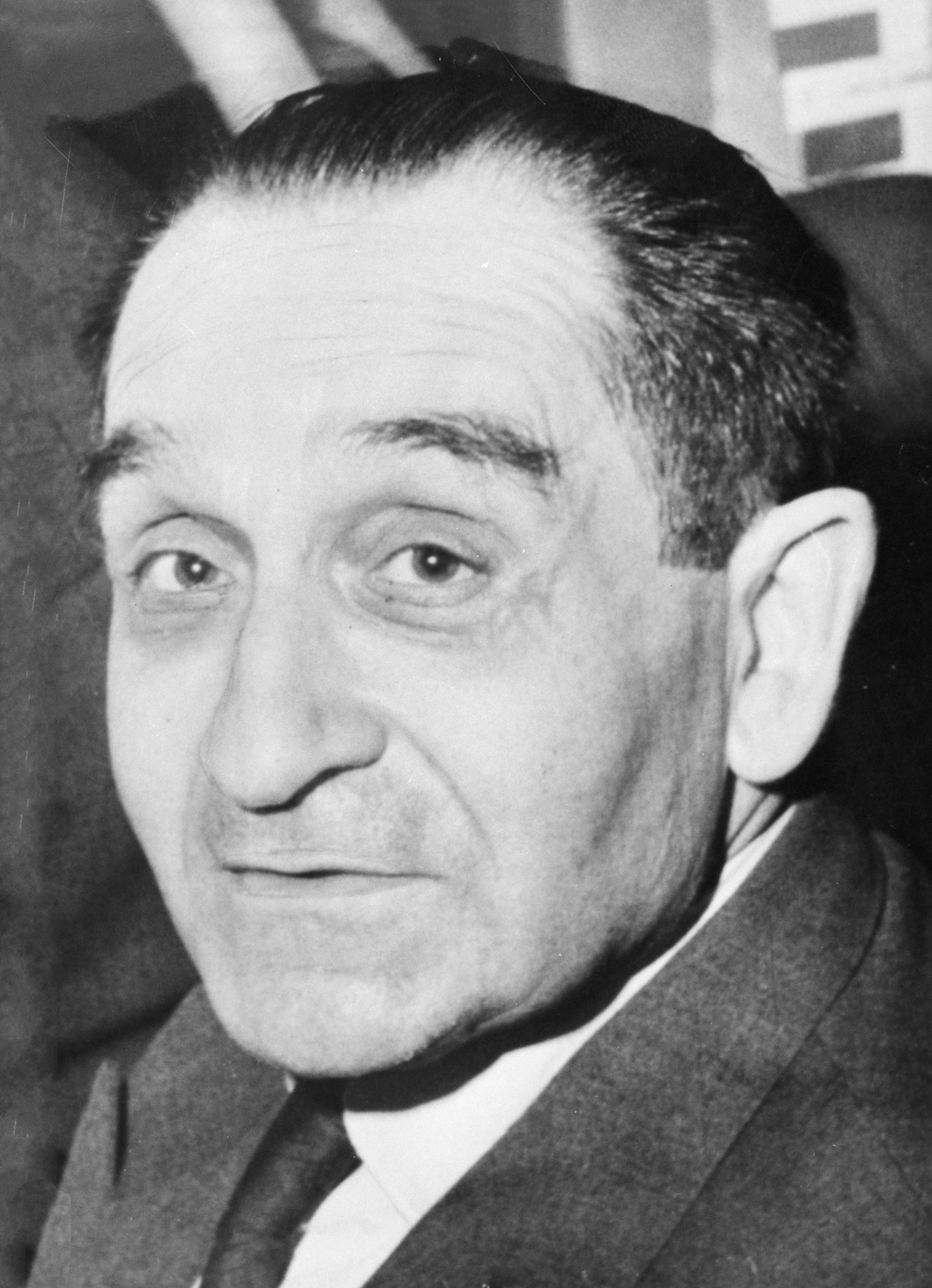
Pierre Mendès France

- January 3 – Ray Milland, Welsh actor, film director (d. 1986)
- January 5 – Volmari Iso-Hollo, Finnish athlete (d. 1969)
- January 8 – Keizō Hayashi, Japanese civil servant, military official (d. 1991)
- January 11 – Pierre Mendès France, French politician, 142nd Prime Minister of France (d. 1982)
- January 12 – Sergei Korolev, Russian rocket scientist (d. 1966)
- January 16 – Alexander Knox, Canadian actor, novelist (d. 1995)
- January 20
  - Manfred von Ardenne, German research and applied physicist, inventor (d. 1997)
  - Paula Wessely, Austrian actress (d. 2000)
- January 22 – Dixie Dean, English football player (d. 1980)
- January 23 – Hideki Yukawa, Japanese physicist, Nobel Prize laureate (d. 1981)
- January 24
  - Maurice Couve de Murville, Prime Minister of France (d. 1999)
  - Ismail Nasiruddin of Terengganu, King of Malaysia (d. 1979)
- January 27 – Joyce Compton, American actress (d. 1997)

=== February ===
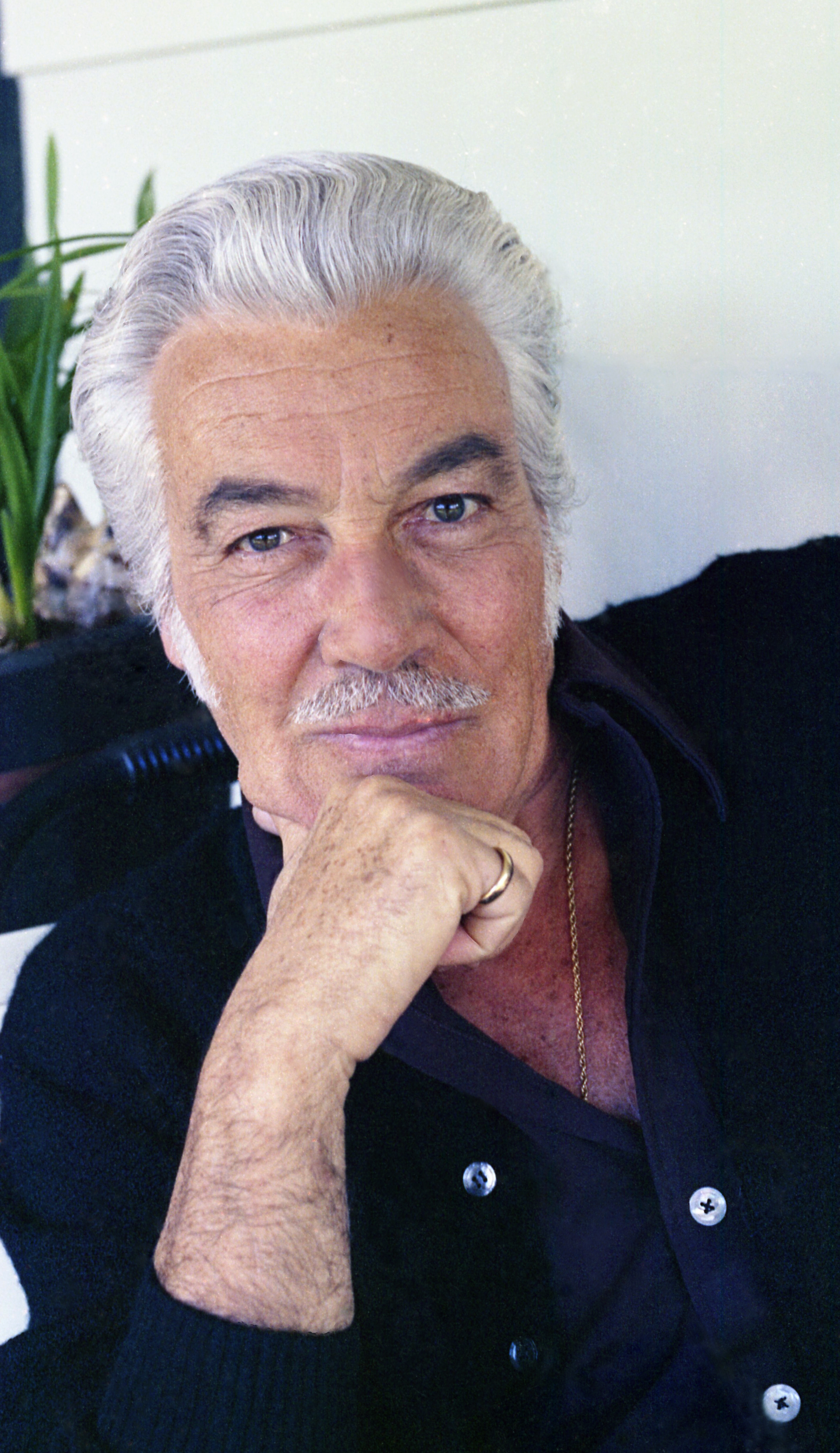
Cesar Romero

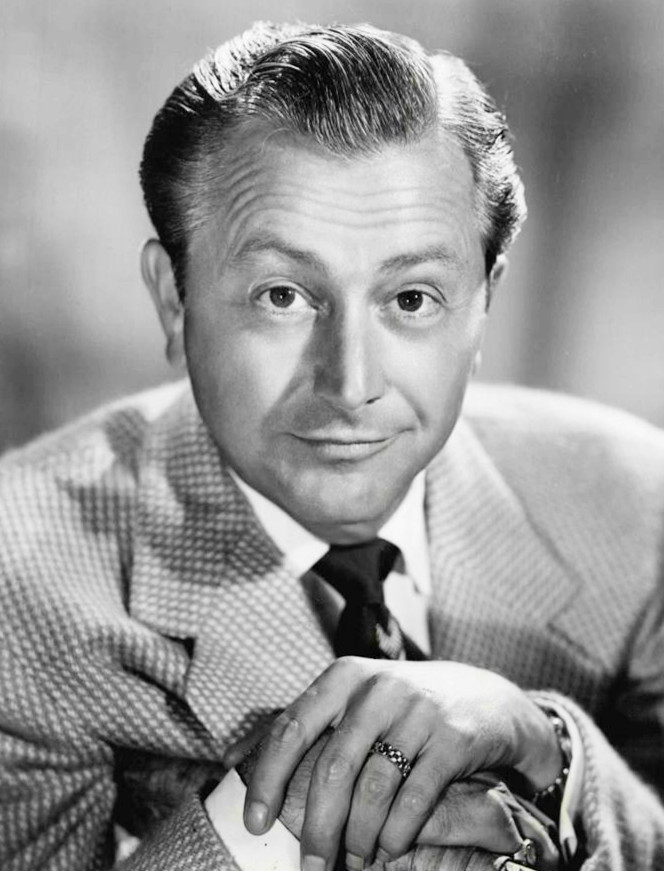
Robert Young

- February 5
  - Pierre Pflimlin, French politician (d. 2000)
  - Sergio Méndez Arceo, Roman Catholic bishop of Cuernavaca, Mexico 1953–1983 (d. 1992)
- February 9 – Trường Chinh, President of Vietnam (d. 1988)
- February 15
  - Jean Langlais, French composer, organist (d. 1991)
  - Cesar Romero, American actor (d. 1994)
- February 18 – Oscar Brodney, American screenwriter (d. 2008)
- February 21 – W. H. Auden, English poet (d. 1973)
- February 22
  - Sheldon Leonard, American actor, writer, director, and producer (d. 1997)
  - Robert Young, American actor (d. 1998)
- February 25 – Kathryn Wasserman Davis, American philanthropist (d. 2013)
- February 26 – Dub Taylor, American actor (d. 1994)
- February 27 – Mildred Bailey, American singer (d. 1951)
- February 28 – Milton Caniff, American cartoonist (d. 1988)

=== March ===
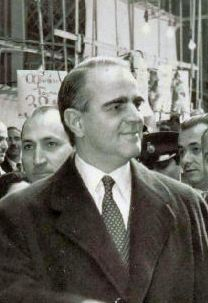
Konstantinos Karamanlis

- March 4 – Maria Branyas, American-born Spanish supercentenarian (d. 2024)
- March 8 – Konstantinos Karamanlis, Greek politician (d. 1998)
- March 9 – Mircea Eliade, Romanian religious historian, writer (d. 1986)
- March 15 – Zarah Leander, Swedish actress, singer (d. 1981)
- March 17
  - Takeo Miki, 41st Prime Minister of Japan (d. 1988)
  - Jean Van Houtte, 38th Prime Minister of Belgium (d. 1991)
- March 18 – John Zachary Young, English biologist (d. 1997)
- March 23 – Daniel Bovet, Swiss-born Italian pharmacologist, Nobel Prize laureate (d. 1992)
- March 26 – Mahadevi Varma, Indian Hindi-language poet, essayist (d. 1987)
- March 28 – Sister Lúcia, Portuguese nun, visionary (d. 2005)
- March 30 – Friedrich August Freiherr von der Heydte, German Luftwaffe officer (d. 1994)

=== April ===
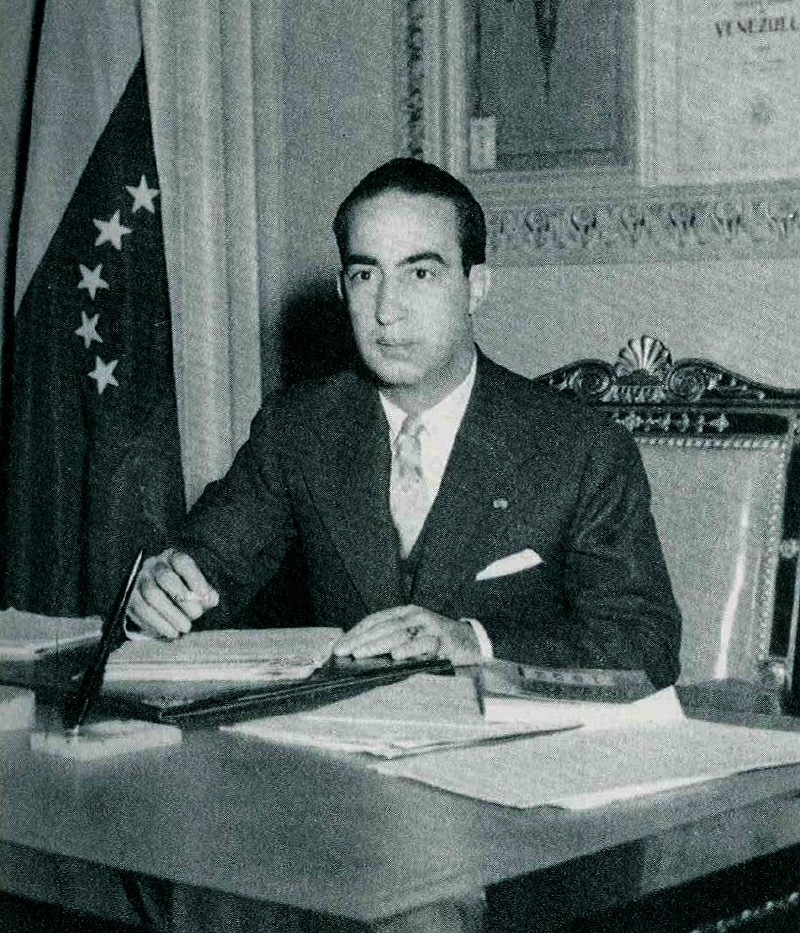
Germán Suárez Flamerich

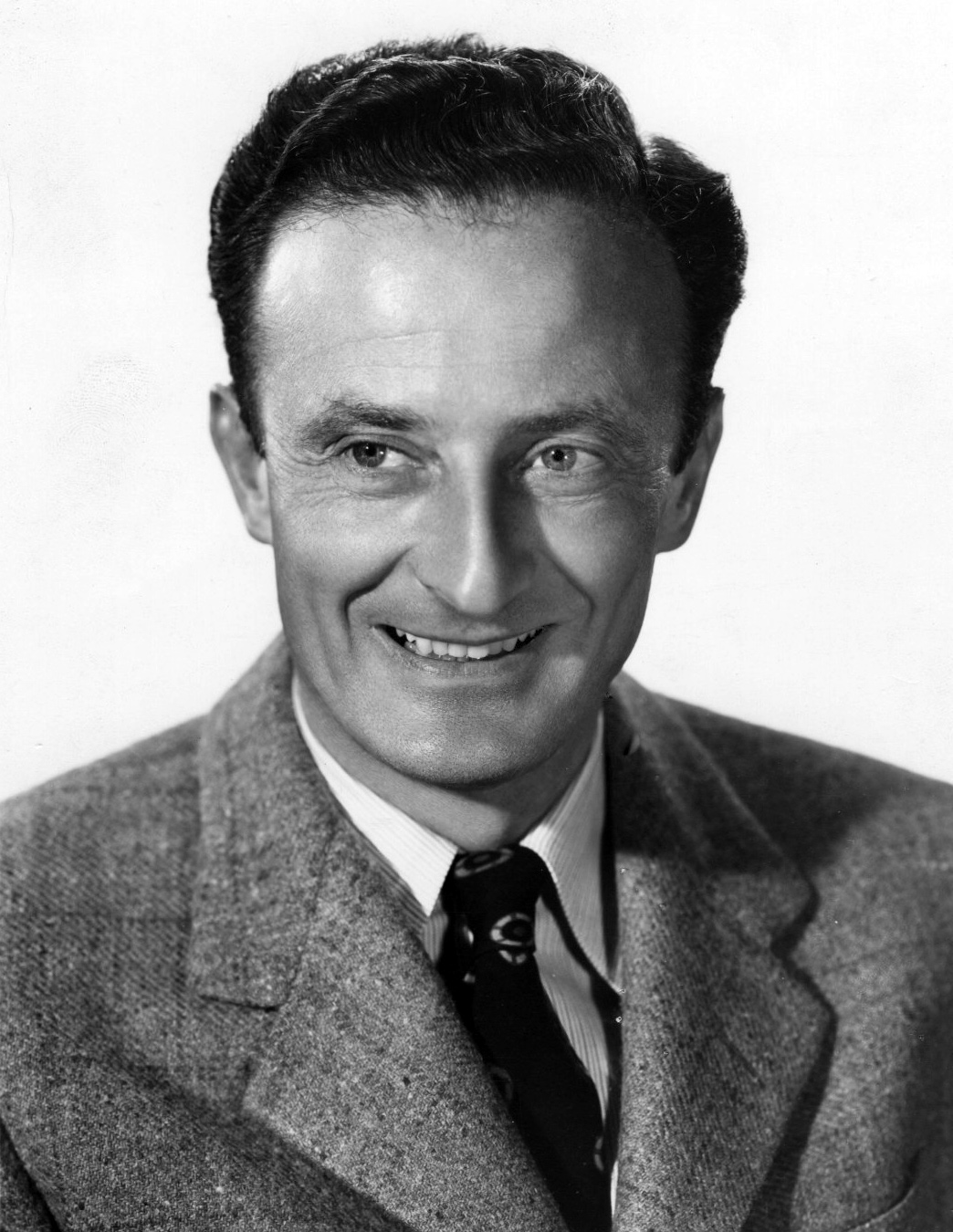
Fred Zinnemann

- April 1 – Shivakumara Swami, Hindu religious figure and humanitarian (d. 2019)
- April 5 – Sanya Dharmasakti, Thai politician, Prime Minister (1973–1975) (d. 2002)
- April 7 – Lê Duẩn, Vietnamese politician (d. 1986)
- April 10 – Germán Suárez Flamerich, Venezuelan lawyer, politician and 50th President of Venezuela (d. 1990)
- April 11 – Paul Douglas, American actor (d. 1959)
- April 12 – Felix de Weldon, Austrian-born American sculptor (d. 2003)
- April 13 – Harold Stassen, American politician (d. 2001)
- April 14 – François Duvalier, 32nd President of Haiti (d. 1971)
- April 15 – Nikolaas Tinbergen, Dutch ornithologist, Nobel Prize laureate (d. 1988)
- April 17 – Martii Miettunen, 2-time Prime Minister of Finland (d. 2002)
- April 21 – Wade Mainer, American singer, banjoist (d. 2011)
- April 24 – William Sargant, British psychiatrist (d. 1988)
- April 26 – Ilias Tsirimokos, Prime Minister of Greece (d. 1968)
- April 29 – Fred Zinnemann, Austrian-born American film director (d. 1997)

=== May ===
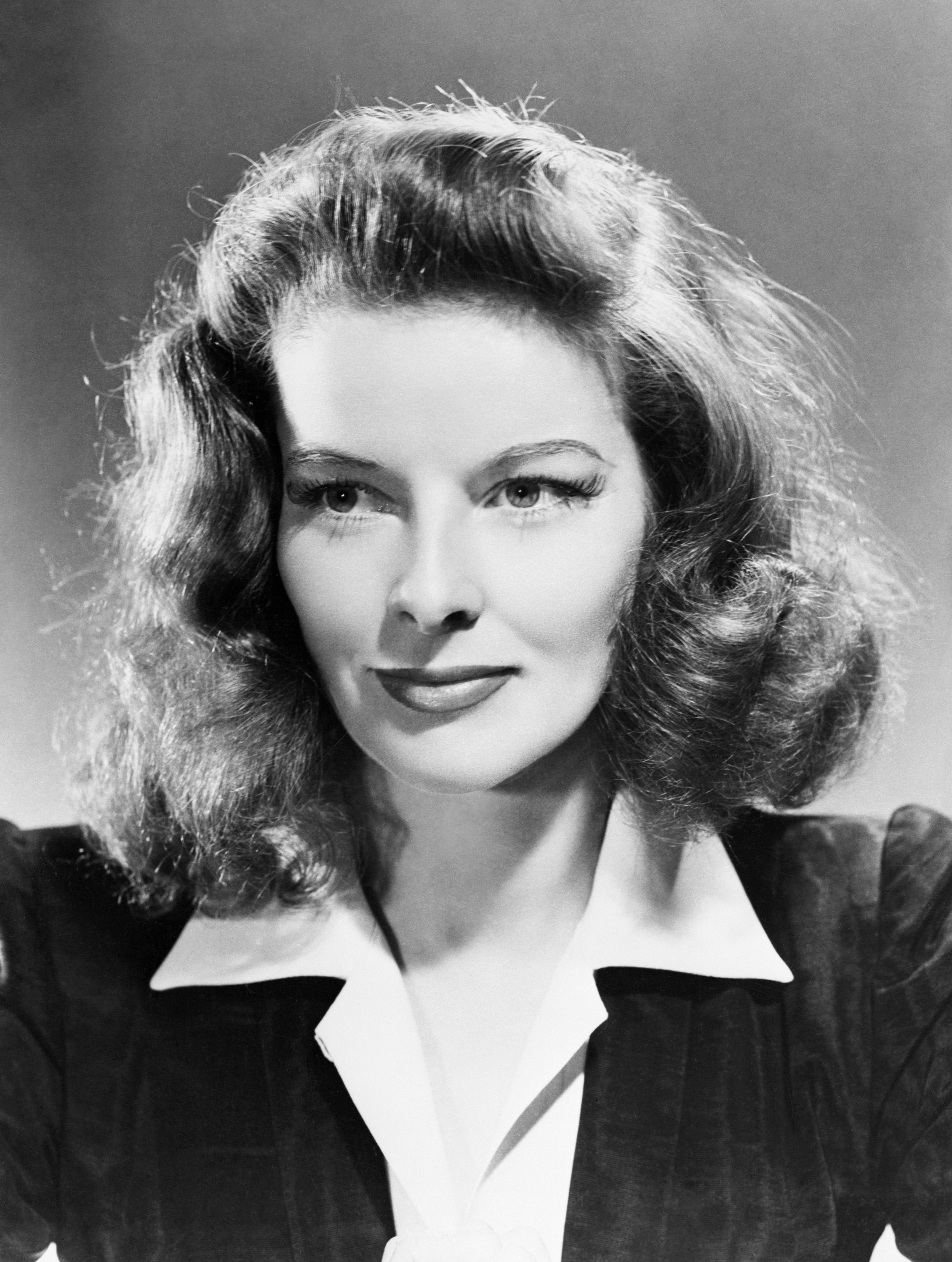
Katharine Hepburn

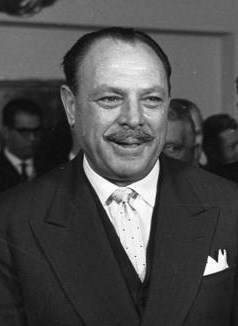
Ayub Khan

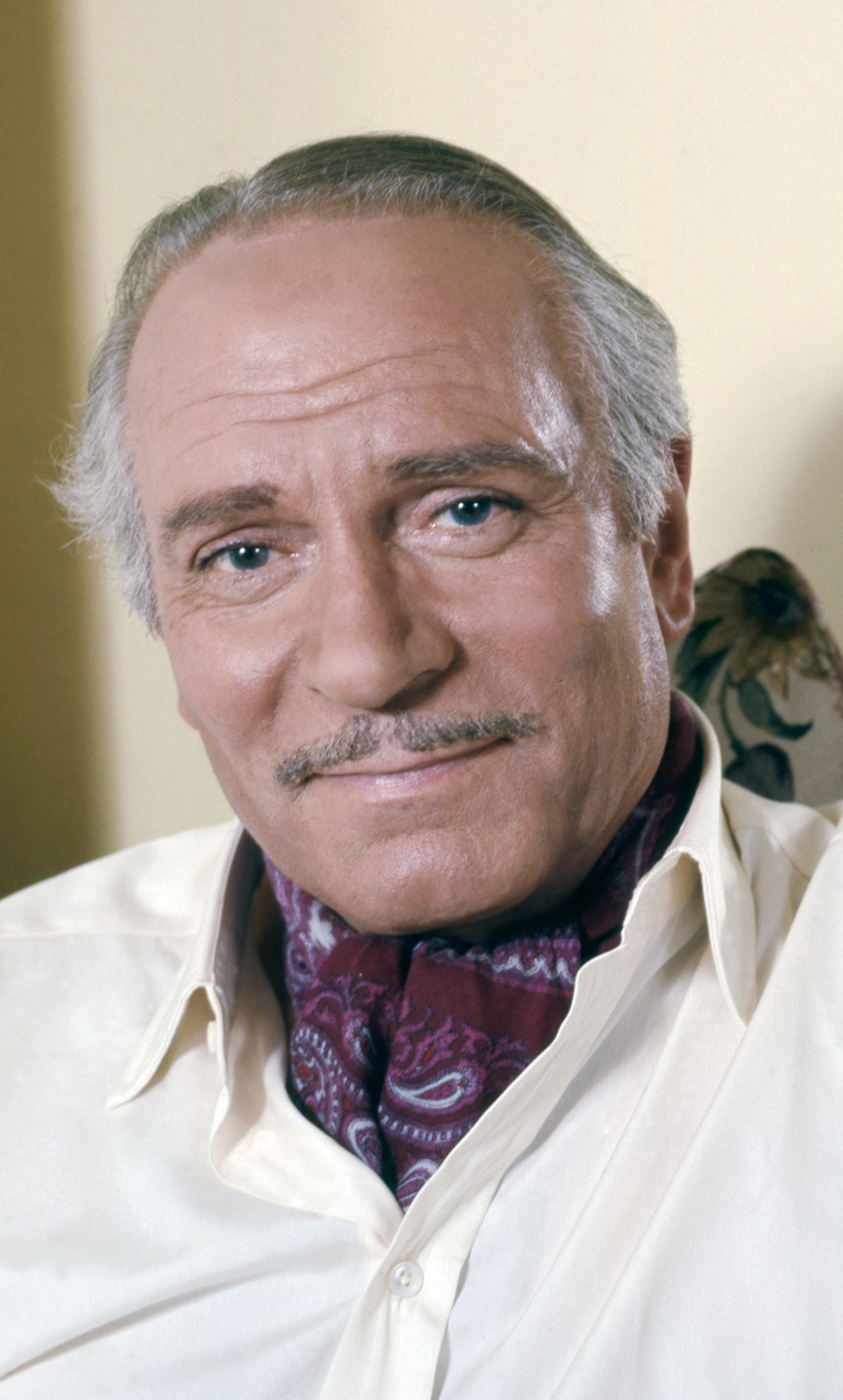
Laurence Olivier

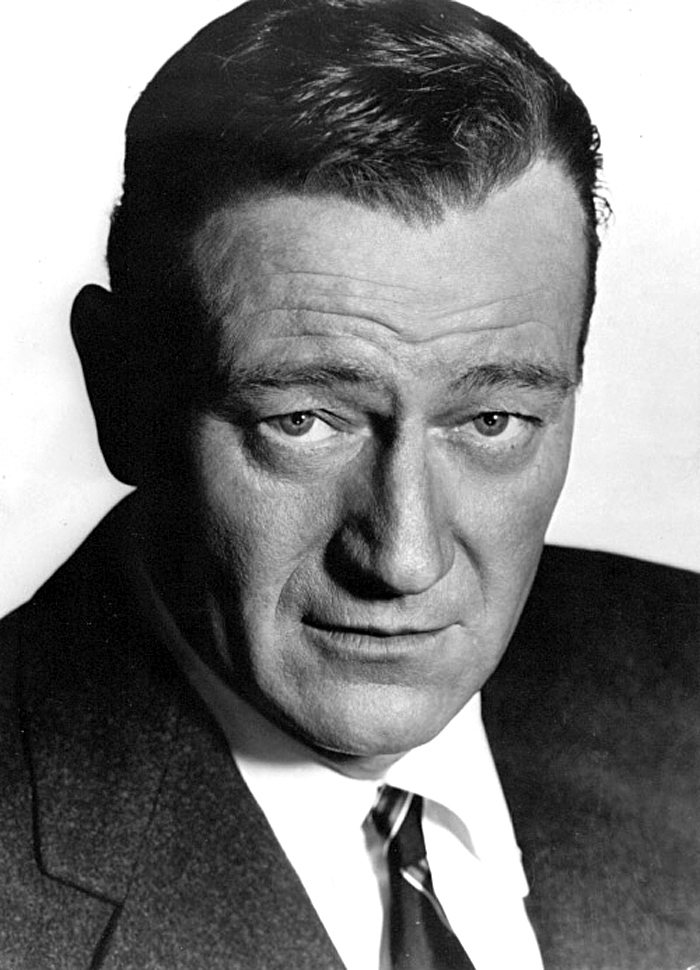
John Wayne

- May 1 – Oliver Hill, American lawyer (d. 2007)
- May 4 – Walter Walsh, American FBI agent and Olympic shooter (d. 2014)
- May 9 – Baldur von Schirach, Nazi official (d. 1974)
- May 12 – Katharine Hepburn, American actress (d. 2003)
- May 13 – Dame Daphne du Maurier, English author (d. 1989)
- May 14
  - Ayub Khan, President of Pakistan (d. 1974)
  - Johnny Moss, American poker player (d. 1995)
- May 16
  - Bob Tisdall, Irish Olympic athlete (d. 2004)
- May 22
  - Hergé, Belgian cartoonist (d. 1983)
  - Laurence Olivier, English stage, screen actor and director (d. 1989)
- May 25 – U Nu, Burmese politician (d. 1995)
- May 26 – John Wayne, American actor, film director (d. 1979)
- May 27
  - Rachel Carson, American environmental writer (d. 1964)
  - Konstantin Anisimovich Pavlov, Latvian iconographer (d. 1976)
- May 30
  - Elly Beinhorn, German pilot (d. 2007)
  - Germaine Tillion, French anthropologist, member of French Resistance (d. 2008)

=== June ===
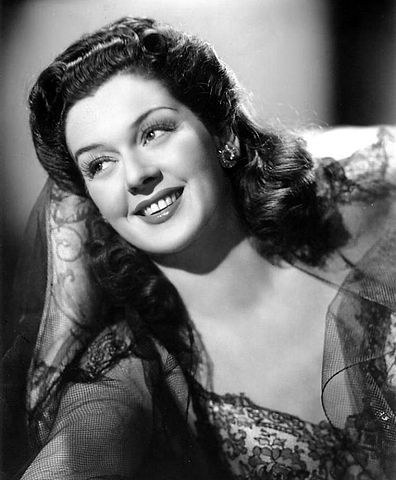
Rosalind Russell

- June 1 – Frank Whittle, British jet engine developer (d. 1996)
- June 4 – Rosalind Russell, American actress (d. 1976)
- June 5 – Rudolf Peierls, German-born British physicist (d. 1995)
- June 14 – René Char, French poet (d. 1988)
- June 16 – Jack Albertson, American actor, comedian (d. 1981)
- June 19 – George de Mestral, Swiss inventor (d. 1990)
- June 23 – James Meade, English economist, Nobel Prize laureate (d. 1995)
- June 25 – J. Hans D. Jensen, German physicist, Nobel Prize laureate (d. 1973)
- June 27 – John McIntire, American actor (d. 1991)
- June 28 – Franciszka Themerson, Polish-born British artist, filmmaker (d. 1989)

=== July ===
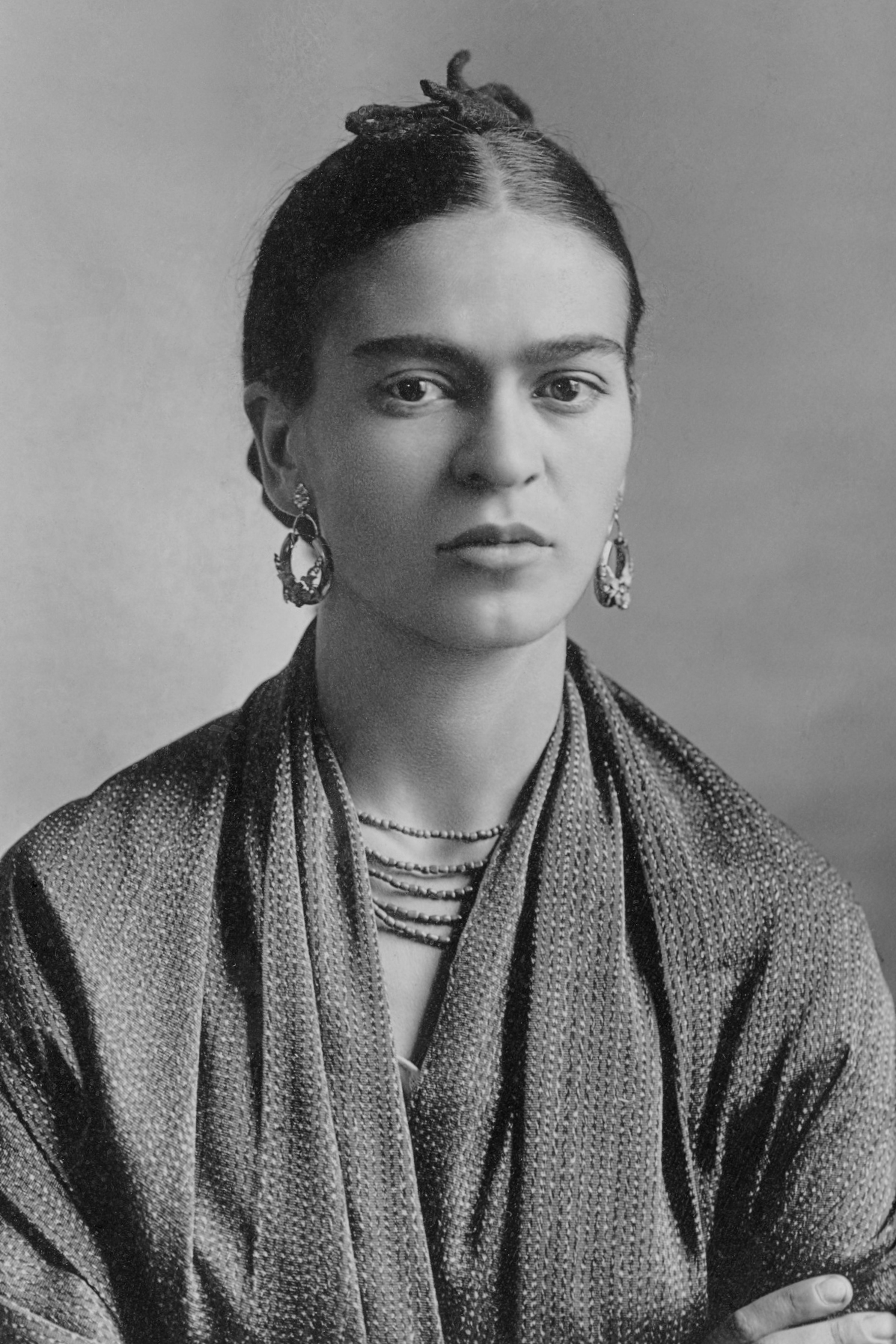
Frida Kahlo

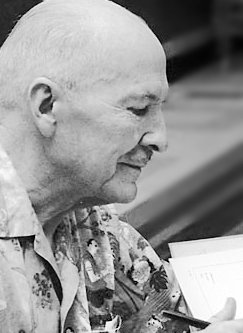
Robert A. Heinlein

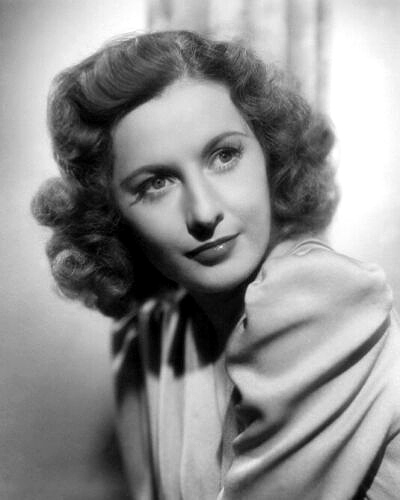
Barbara Stanwyck

- July 3 – Horia Sima, Romanian fascist politician (d. 1993)
- July 4 – Henning Holck-Larsen, Danish engineer and businessman (d. 2003)
- July 6
  - Frida Kahlo, Mexican painter (d. 1954)
  - George Stanley, Canadian historian, author, soldier, teacher, public servant, and designer (d. 2002)
- July 7
  - Robert A. Heinlein, American science fiction author (d. 1988)
  - Pavel Sudoplatov, Russian lieutenant general and spy (d. 1996)
  - Prince Vasili Alexandrovich of Russia (d. 1989)
- July 13 – George Weller, American novelist, playwright, and journalist (d. 2002)
- July 14 – Annabella, French actress (d. 1996)
- July 16 – Barbara Stanwyck, American actress (d. 1990)
- July 19
  - Isabel Jewell, American actress (d. 1972)
  - Paul Magloire, President of Haiti (d. 2001)
- July 21 – A. D. Hope, Australian poet and essayist (d. 2000)
- July 22
  - Aldo Donelli, American football player and coach, soccer player, and college athletics administrator (d. 1994)
  - Zubir Said, Singaporean composer of Singapore's national anthem (d. 1987)
- July 25 – Johnny Hodges, American alto saxophonist (d. 1970)
- July 27 – Richard Beesly, British Olympic gold medal rower (d. 1965)
- July 29 – Melvin Belli, American lawyer (d. 1996)

=== August ===
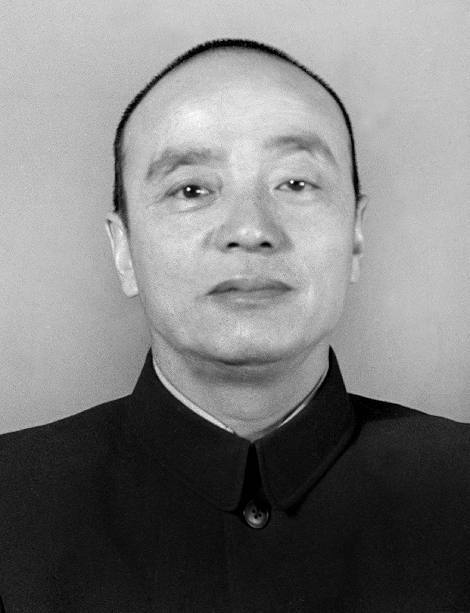
Yang Shangkun

- August 3
  - Ernesto Geisel, 29th President of Brazil (d. 1996)
  - Yang Shangkun, President of China (d. 1998)
  - Irene Tedrow, American actress (d. 1995)
- August 7 – Bernard Beryl Brodie, English-born American chemist and pharmacologist (d. 1989)
- August 8 – Benny Carter, American musician (d. 2003)
- August 12
  - Joe Besser, American comedian (d. 1988)
  - Benjamin Sheares, 2nd President of Singapore (d. 1981)
- August 15 – Bob Pearson, British variety performer with his brother Alf as half of Bob and Alf Pearson (d. 1985)
- August 20 – Alan Reed, American actor and voice actor (d. 1977)
- August 21 – John G. Trump, American electrical engineer, inventor, and physicist (d. 1985)
- August 24 – Gil Perkins, Australian actor and stuntman (d. 1999)
- August 28 – Rupert Hart-Davis, British publisher (d. 1999)
- August 29 – Lurene Tuttle, American character actress (d. 1986)
- August 30 – Leonor Fini, Argentine artist (d. 1996)
- August 31
  - Augustus F. Hawkins, American politician and civil rights lawmaker (d. 2007)
  - Ramon Magsaysay, 7th President of the Philippines (d. 1957)

=== September ===
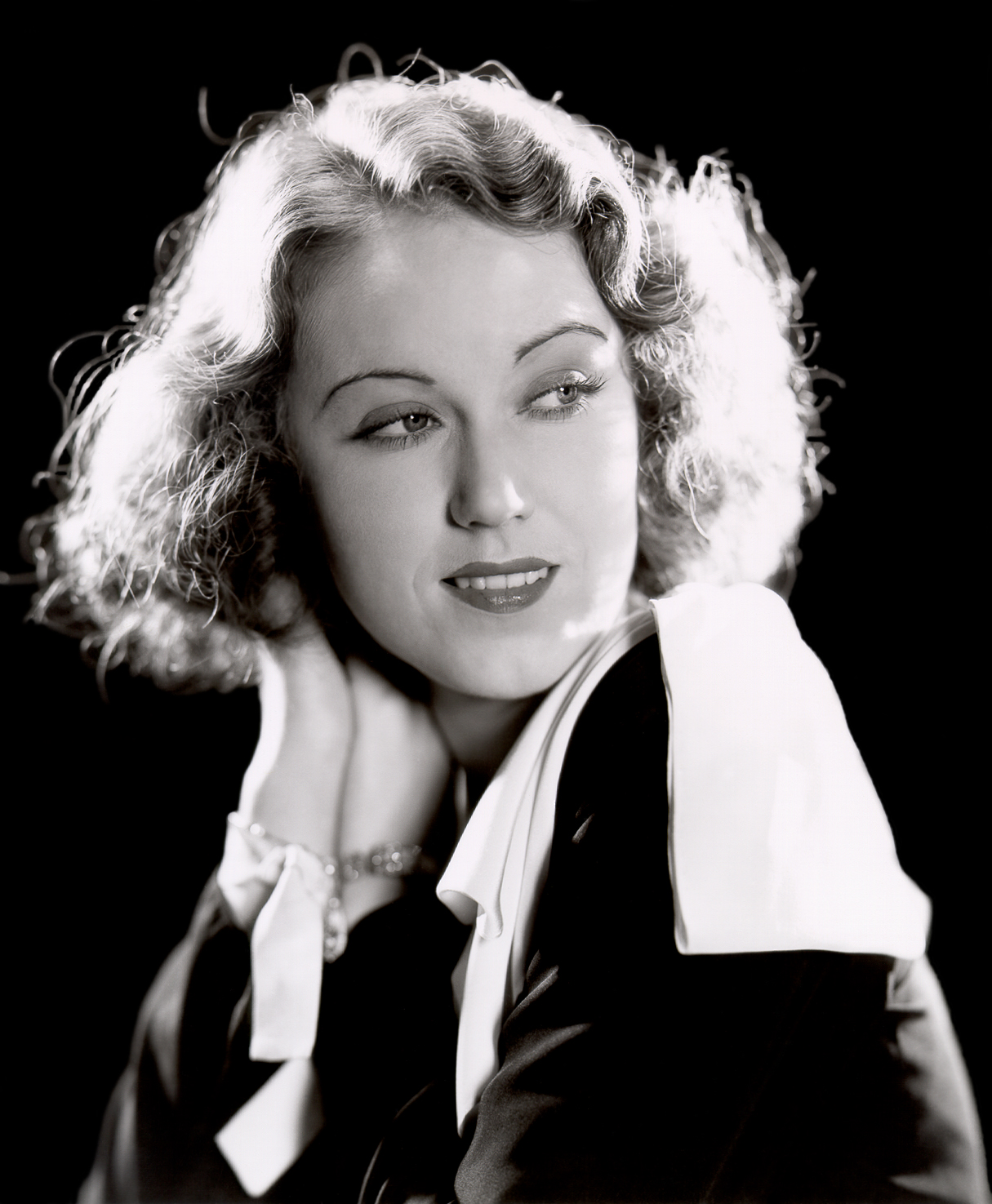
Fay Wray

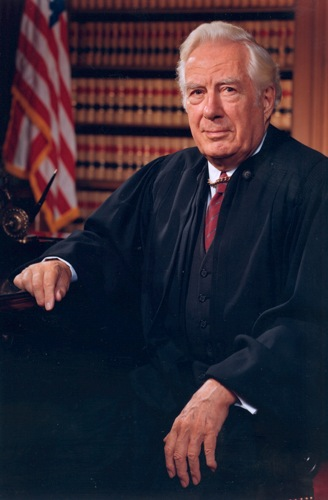
Warren E. Burger

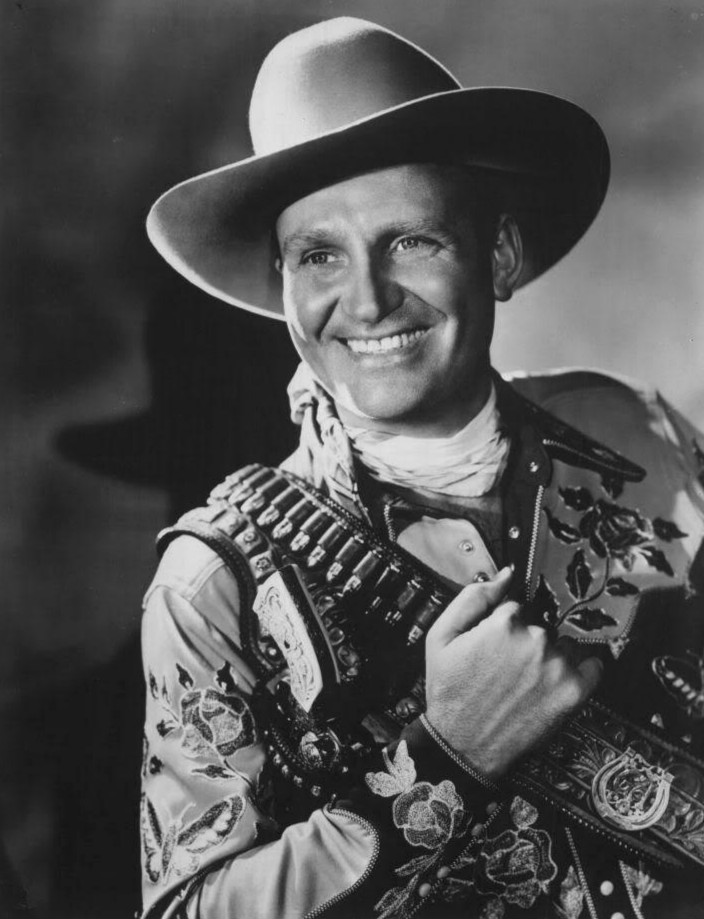
Gene Autry

- September 1 – Walter Reuther, American labor union leader and president of the United Auto Workers (d. 1970)
- September 2 – Evelyn Hooker, American psychologist (d. 1996)
- September 3 – Loren Eiseley, American author (d. 1977)
- September 12 – Louis MacNeice, Northern Irish poet (d. 1963)
- September 15 – Fay Wray, Canadian-born American actress (d. 2004)
- September 17 – Warren E. Burger, 15th Chief Justice of the United States (d. 1995)
- September 18 – Edwin McMillan, American chemist, Nobel Prize laureate (d. 1991)
- September 19 – Lewis F. Powell Jr., Associate Justice of the Supreme Court of the United States (d. 1998)
- September 22 – Maurice Blanchot, French philosopher, writer (d. 2003)
- September 23 – Duarte Nuno, Duke of Braganza, pretender to the throne of Portugal (d. 1976)
- September 26
  - Anthony Blunt, British art historian, spy (d. 1983)
  - Bep van Klaveren, Dutch boxer (d. 1992)
- September 27 – Bhagat Singh, Indian revolutionary (d. 1931)
- September 28 – Heikki Savolainen, Finnish artistic gymnast (d. 1997)
- September 29 – Gene Autry, American actor, singer, and businessman (d. 1998)

=== October ===
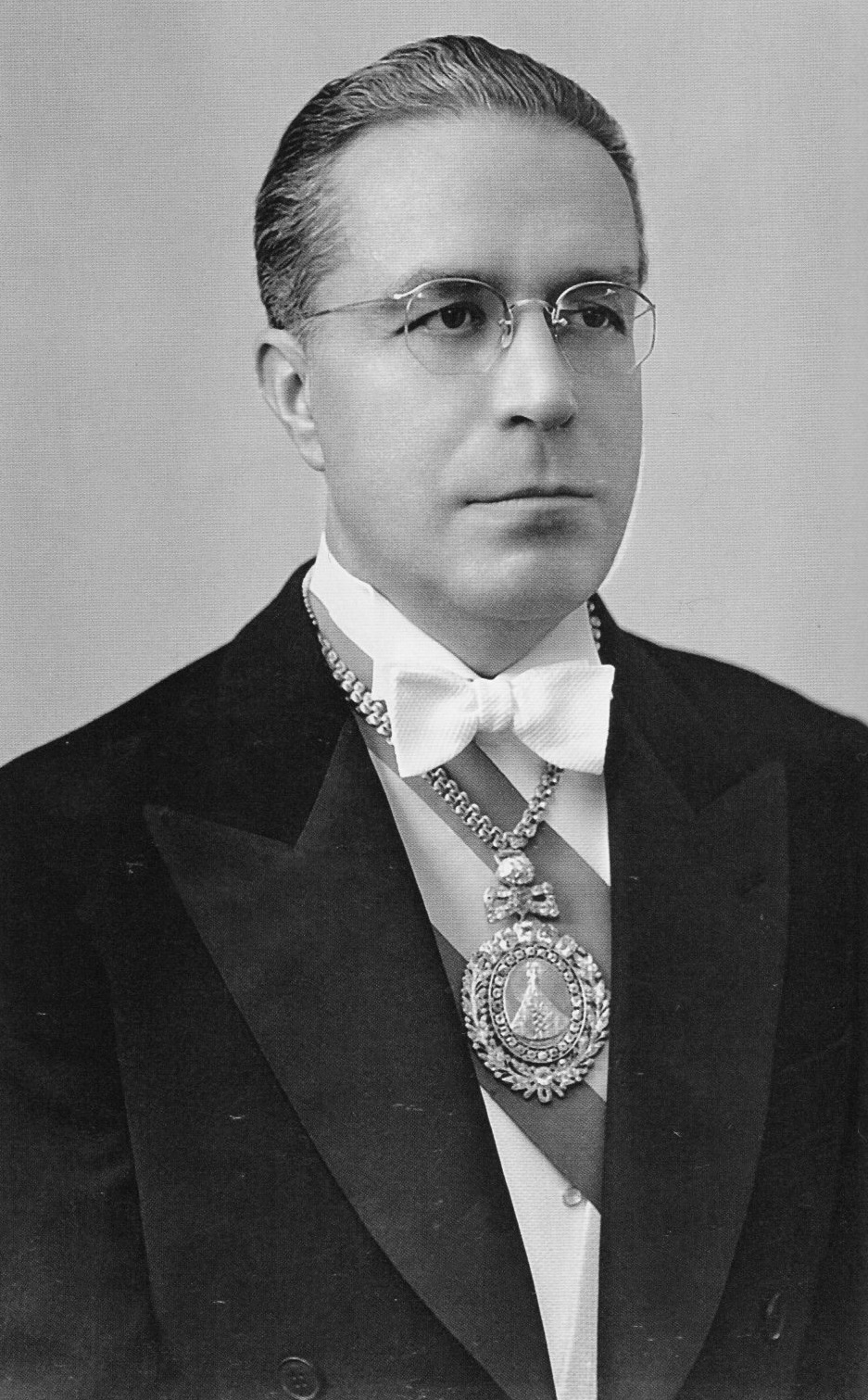
Víctor Paz Estenssoro

- October 2
  - Alec Todd, Scottish chemist, Nobel Prize laureate (d. 1997)
  - Víctor Paz Estenssoro, 45th President of Bolivia (d. 2001)
- October 9 – Quintin Hogg, Baron Hailsham of St Marylebone, British politician (d. 2001)
- October 15 – Varian Fry, American journalist, rescuer (d. 1967)
- October 17 – John Marley, American actor (d. 1984)
- October 19 – Roger Wolfe Kahn, American bandleader (d. 1962)
- October 28
  - John Hewitt, Irish poet (d. 1987)
  - Sergio Méndez Arceo, 7th Mexican bishop of Cuernavaca 1953–1982, and advocate of Liberation theology (d. 1991).

=== November ===
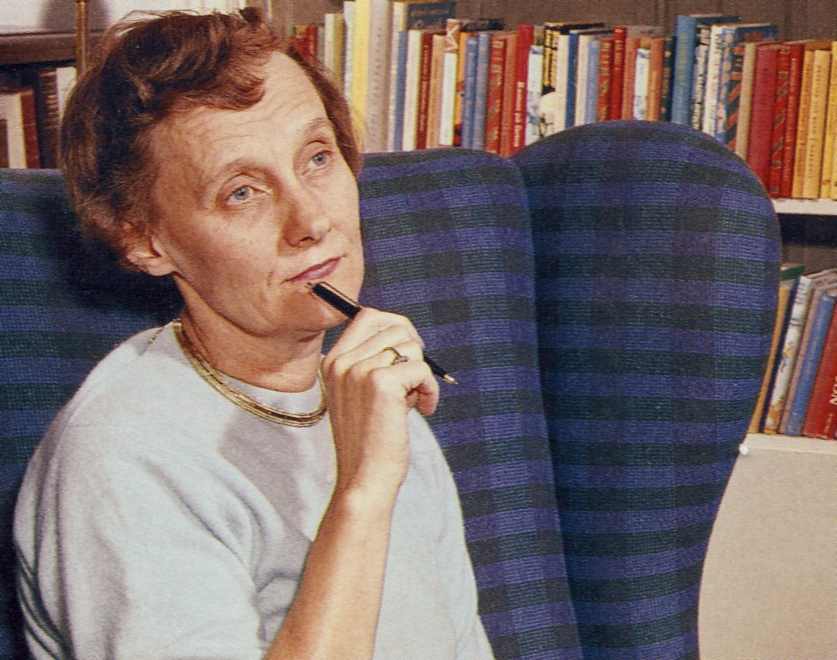
Astrid Lindgren

- November 1 – Homero Manzi, Argentine tango lyricist, author (d. 1951)
- November 9 – Louis Ferdinand, Prince of Prussia (d. 1994)
- November 10 – Salme Reek, Estonian actress (d. 1996)
- November 14
  - Howard W. Hunter, 14th president of the Church of Jesus Christ of Latter-day Saints (d. 1995)
  - Astrid Lindgren, Swedish children's writer (d. 2002)
  - William Steig, American cartoonist (d. 2003)
- November 15 – Claus Schenk Graf von Stauffenberg, German aristocrat, military officer (d. 1944)
- November 16 – Burgess Meredith, American actor, director (d. 1997)
- November 18 – Compay Segundo, Cuban musician (d. 2003)
- November 19 – Luigi Beccali, Italian Olympic athlete (d. 1990)
- November 23 – Run Run Shaw, Hong Kong media mogul (d. 2014)
- November 26 – Ruth Patrick, American botanist (d. 2013)
- November 27 – L. Sprague de Camp, American writer (d. 2000)
- November 28 – Alberto Moravia, Italian novelist (d. 1990)
- November 30 – Jacques Barzun, French-born American historian (d. 2012)

=== December ===
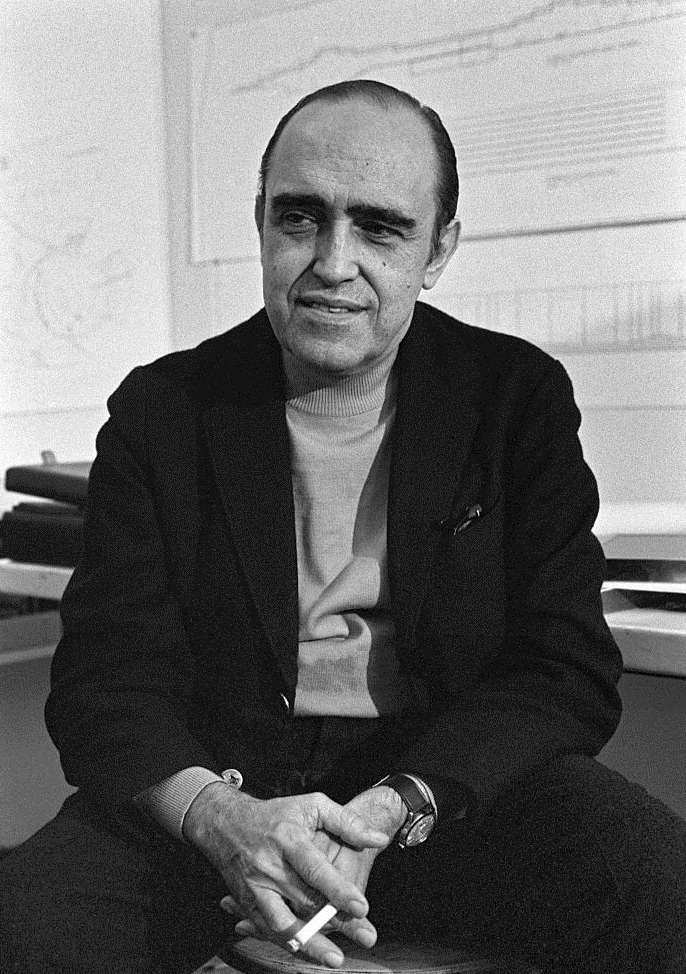
Oscar Niemeyer

- December 5 – Lin Biao, Chinese communist military leader (d. 1971)
- December 12 – Roy Douglas, British composer (d. 2015)
- December 15 – Oscar Niemeyer, Brazilian architect (d. 2012)
- December 16 – Barbara Kent, Canadian silent film actress (d. 2011)
- December 19 – Jimmy McLarnin, Irish-born boxer (d. 2004)
- December 22 – Peggy Ashcroft, British actress (d. 1991)
- December 23 – James Roosevelt, American businessman, politician (d. 1991)
- December 25 – Cab Calloway, American jazz singer and bandleader (d. 1994)
- December 27 – Johann Trollmann, German boxer (d. 1944)

== Deaths ==
=== January ===
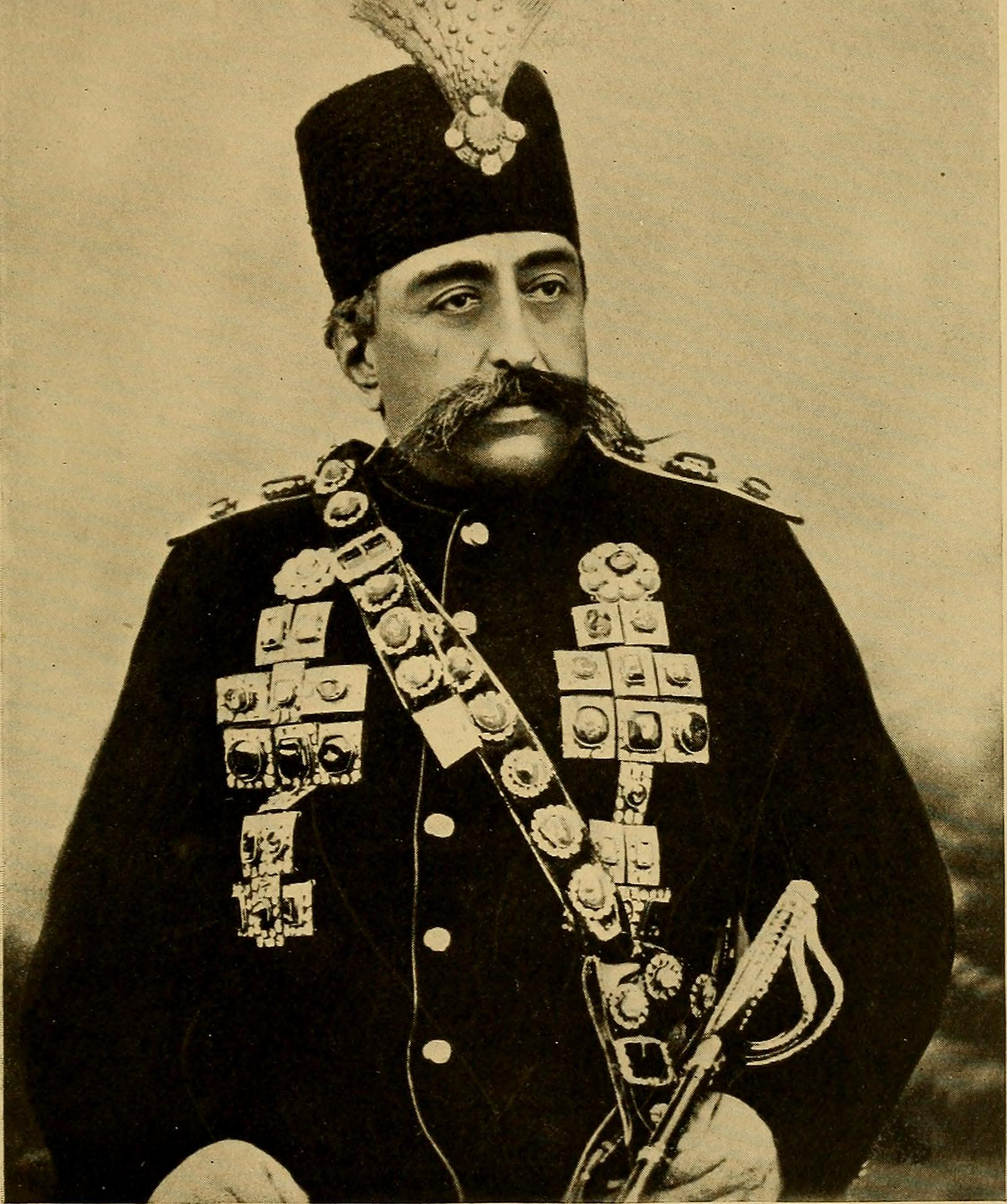
Mozaffar ad-Din Shah Qajar

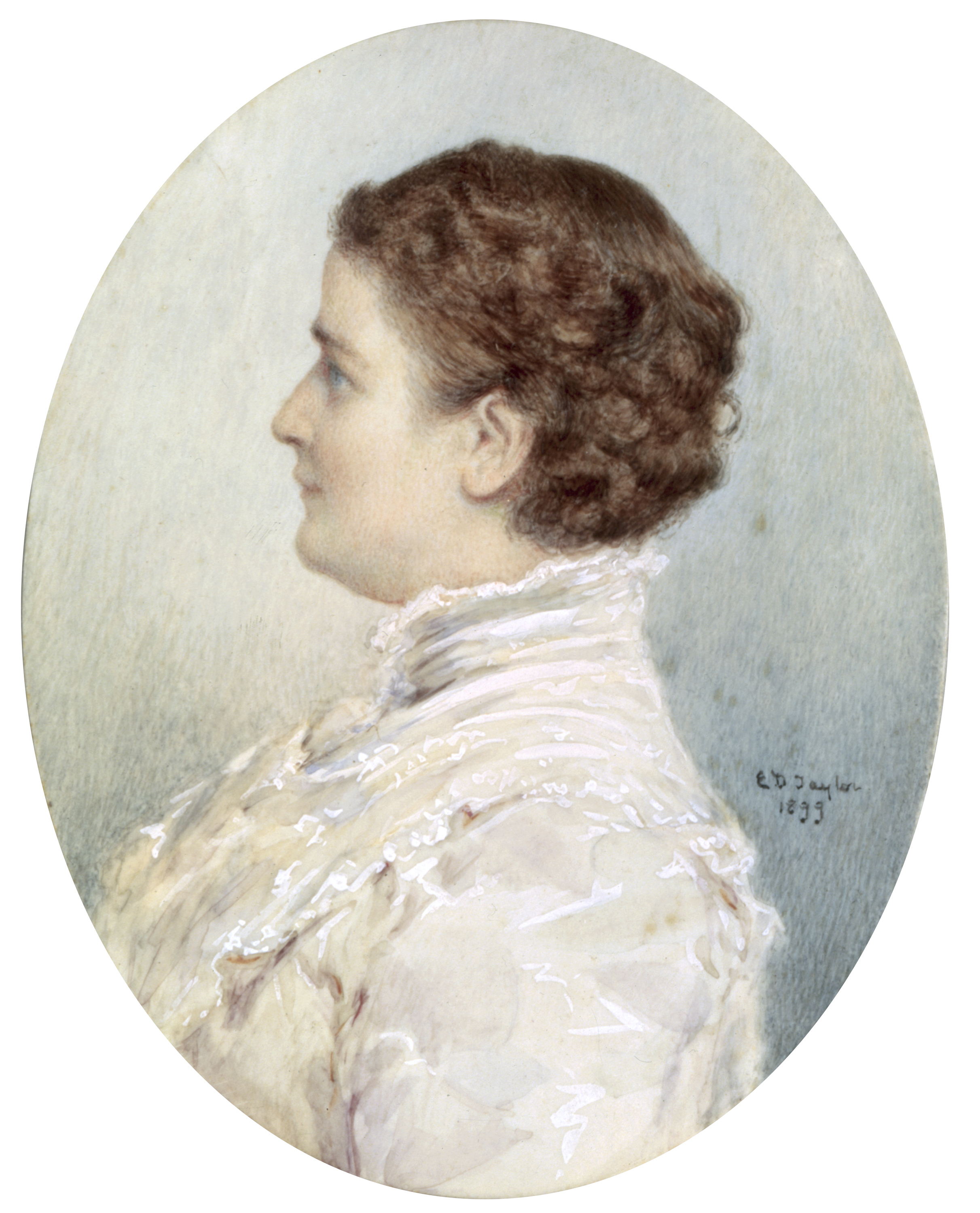
Ida Saxton McKinley

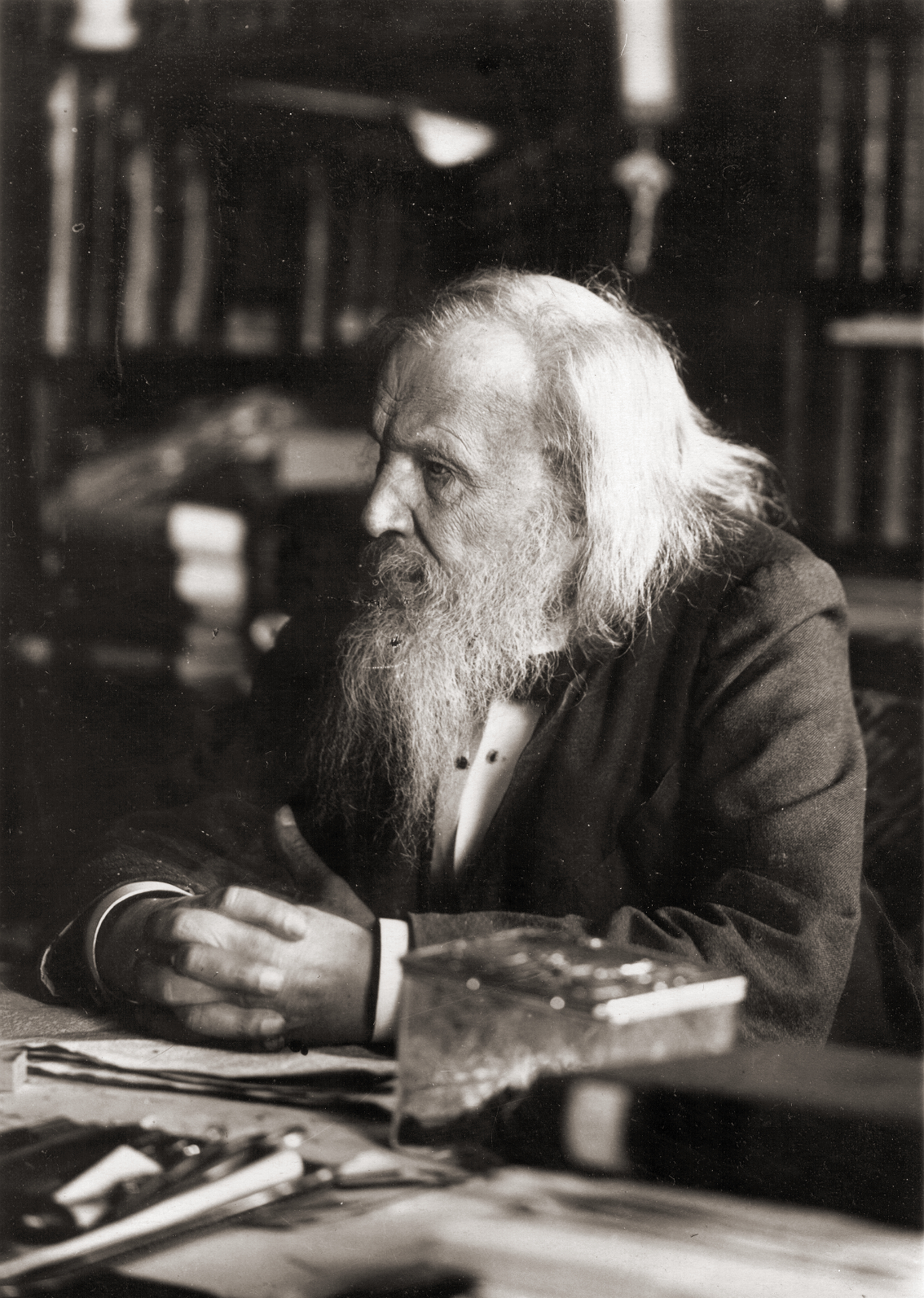
Dmitri Mendeleev

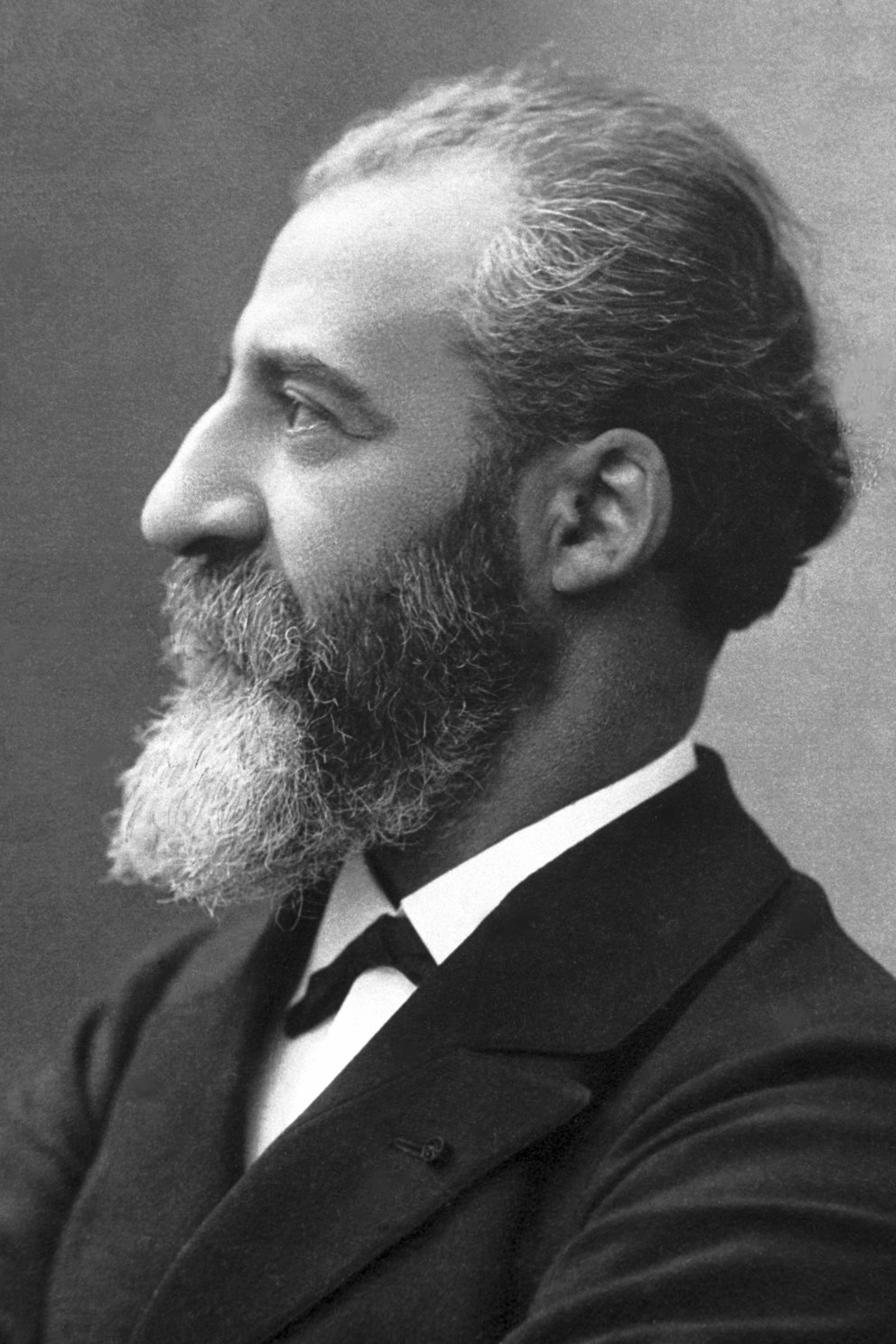
Henri Moissan

- January 3 – Mozaffar ad-Din Shah Qajar, Shah of Iran (b. 1853)
- January 13 – Jakob Hurt, Estonian folklorist, theologian, and linguist (b. 1839)
- January 14 – Hermann Iseke, German doctor (b. 1856)
- January 19 – Giuseppe Saracco, 15th Prime Minister of Italy (b. 1821)
- January 21 – Graziadio Isaia Ascoli, Italian linguist (b. 1829)
- January 31 – Timothy Eaton, Canadian department store founder (b. 1834)

=== February ===
- February 2 – Dmitri Mendeleev, Russian chemist (b. 1834)
- February 7 – Preston Leslie, 26th Governor of Kentucky and 9th territorial Governor of Montana (b. 1819)
- February 12 – Muriel Robb, English tennis player (b. 1878)
- February 13 – Marcel Alexandre Bertrand, French geologist (b. 1847)
- February 16
  - Giosuè Carducci, Italian writer, Nobel Prize laureate (b. 1835)
  - Clémentine of Orléans, daughter of King Louis-Philippe of France (b. 1817)
- February 17 – Henry Steel Olcott, American officer, theosophist (b. 1832)
- February 20 – Henri Moissan, French chemist, Nobel Prize laureate (b. 1852)
- February 21 – Erik Gustaf Boström, 7th Prime Minister of Sweden (b. 1842)
- February 26 – C. W. Alcock, English footballer, journalist, and football promoter (b. 1842)

=== March ===
- March 3 – Oronhyatekha, Canadian Mohawk physician, CEO of an international benefit society, native statesman, scholar, rights campaigner and international shooter (b. 1841)
- March 7 – Charlotta Raa-Winterhjelm, Swedish actress (b. 1838)
- March 9 – Frederic George Stephens, English art critic (b. 1828)
- March 10 – George Douglas-Pennant, 2nd Baron Penrhyn, Welsh industrialist (b. 1836)
- March 11
  - Jean Casimir-Perier, 6th President of France (b. 1847)
  - Dimitar Petkov, 14th Prime Minister of Bulgaria (assassinated) (b. 1847)
- March 18 – Marcellin Berthelot, French chemist (b. 1827)
- March 19
  - Thomas Bailey Aldrich, American poet and novelist (b. 1836)
  - Mariano Baptista, 23rd President of Bolivia (b. 1832)
- March 23 – Konstantin Pobedonostsev, Russian statesman (b. 1827)
- March 25 – Ernst von Bergmann, Baltic German surgeon (b. 1836)

=== April ===
- April 6 – William Henry Drummond, Irish-Canadian poet (b. 1854)
- April 14 – Frank Manly Thorn, American lawyer, politician, government official, essayist, journalist, humorist, inventor, and 6th Superintendent of the United States Coast and Geodetic Survey (b. 1836)
- April 23 – Alferd Packer, American cannibal (b. 1842)

=== May ===
- May 1 – Melissa Elizabeth Riddle Banta, American poet (b. 1834)
- May 4 – John Watts de Peyster, American author, philanthropist, and soldier (b. 1821)
- May 6 – Emanuele Luigi Galizia, Maltese architect, civil engineer (b. 1830)
- May 12 – Joris-Karl Huysmans, French author (b. 1848)
- May 19 – Sir Benjamin Baker, English civil engineer (b. 1840)
- May 26 – Ida Saxton McKinley, First Lady of the United States (b. 1847)
- May 27 – Kevork Chavush, Armenian national hero (b. 1870)

=== June ===
- June 4 – Agathe Backer-Grøndahl, Norwegian pianist and composer (b. 1847)
- June 6 – J. A. Chatwin, English architect (b. 1830)
- June 14
  - Bartolomé Masó, Cuban patriot (b. 1830)
  - William Le Baron Jenney, American architect, engineer (b. 1832)
- June 23 – Hod Stuart, Canadian professional ice hockey player, killed in diving accident (b. 1879)
- June 25 – Sir John Hall, 12th Prime Minister of New Zealand (b. 1824)
- June 29 – Maximilian Cercha, Polish painter and drawer (b. 1818)

=== July ===
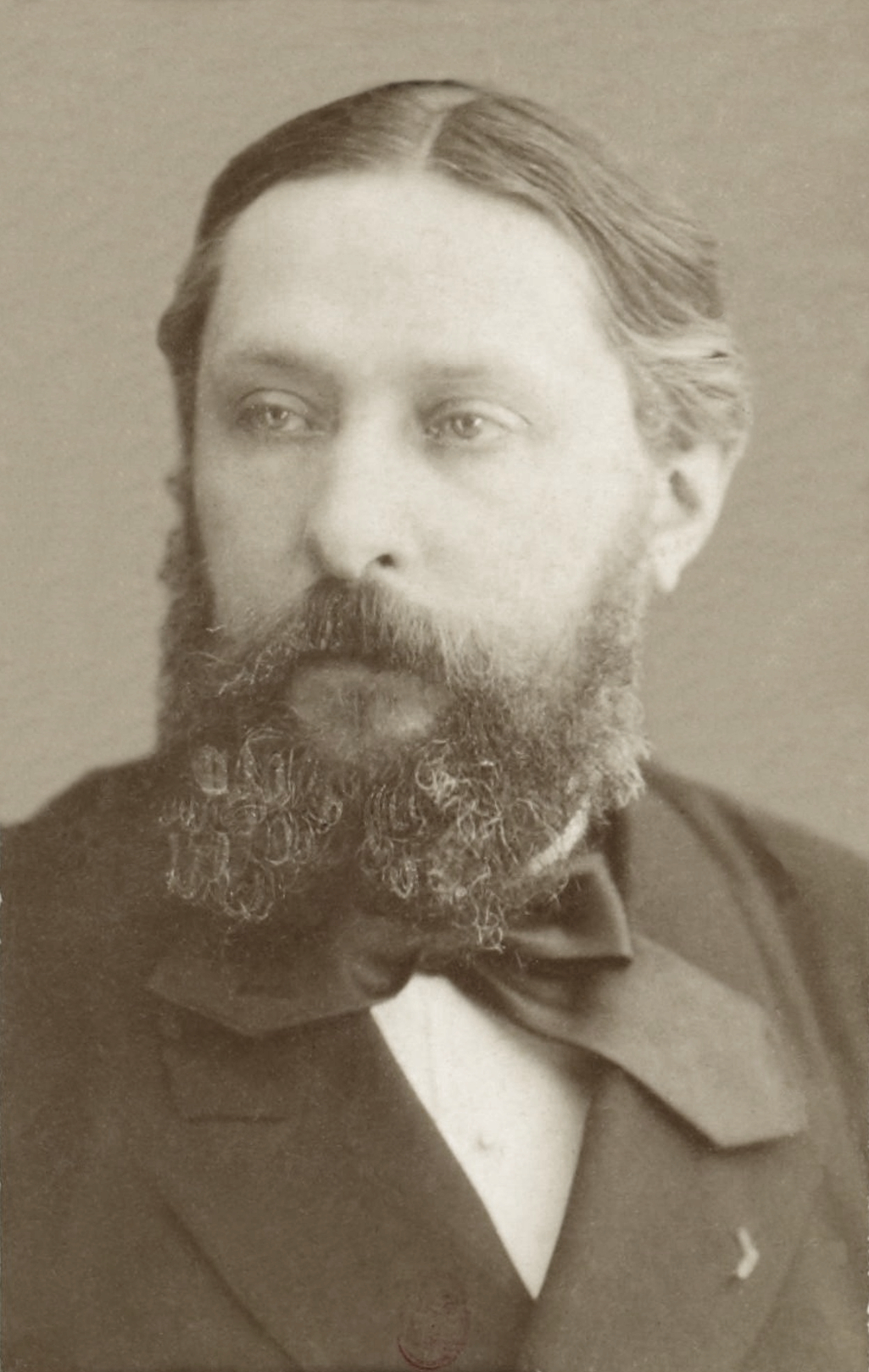
Sully Prudhomme

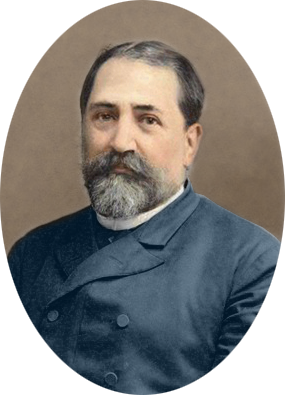
Saint Ilia Chavchavadze

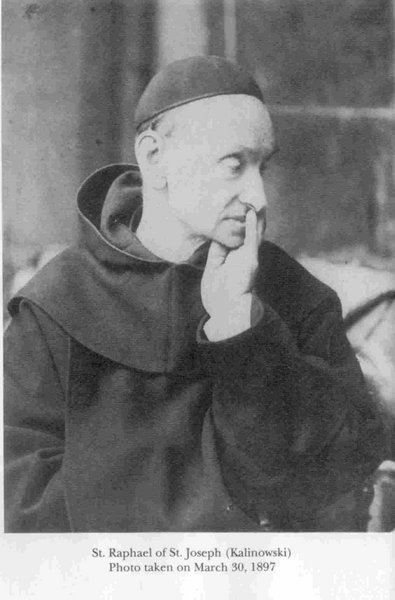
Saint Raphael Kalinowski

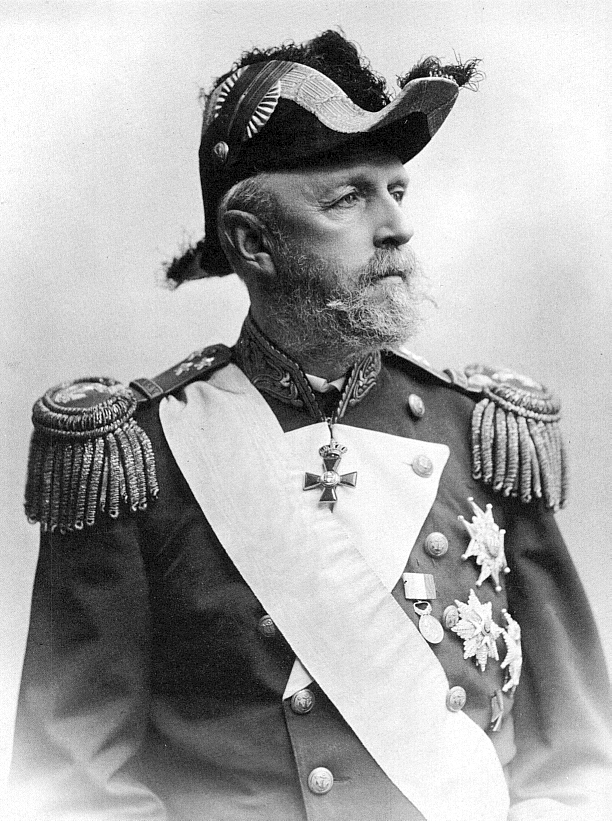
King Oscar II of Sweden

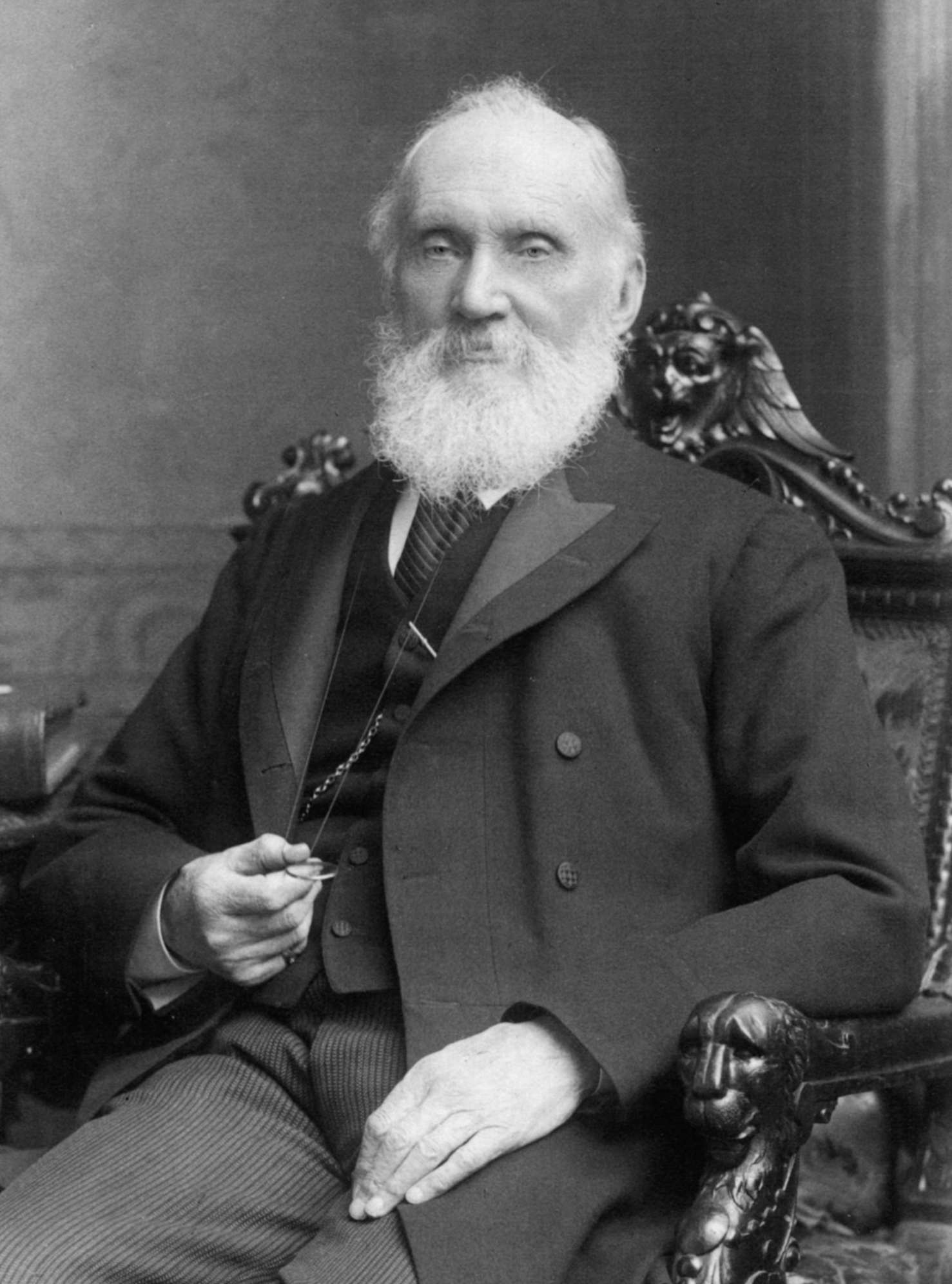
William Thomson, 1st Baron Kelvin

- July 13 – Heinrich Kreutz, German astronomer (b. 1854)
- July 14 – Sir William Perkin, English chemist (b. 1838)
- July 15 – Qiu Jin, Chinese revolutionary, feminist and poet, executed (b. 1875)
- July 28 – Mildred Amanda Baker Bonham, American travel writer (b. 1840)

=== August ===
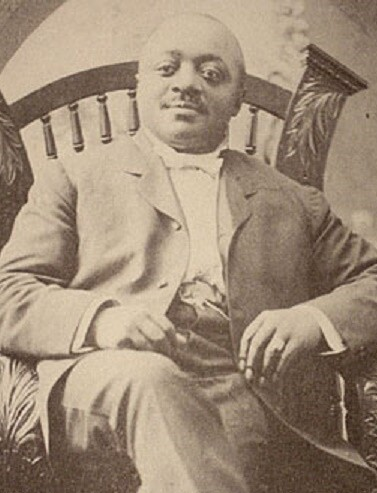
John "Mushmouth" Johnson

- August – Dinqinesh Mercha, empress consort of Ethiopia (b. 1815)
- August 1
  - Lucy Mabel Hall-Brown, American physician and writer (b. 1843)
  - Ernesto Hintze Ribeiro, 3-time Prime Minister of Portugal (b. 1849)
- August 3 – Augustus Saint-Gaudens, Irish-American Beaux-Arts sculptor (b. 1848)
- August 4 – Richard Meade, Lord Gilford, British admiral (b. 1832)
- August 13 – Hermann Carl Vogel, German astrophysicist (b. 1841)
- August 15 – Joseph Joachim, Austrian violinist (b. 1831)
- August 25
  - Mary Elizabeth Coleridge, British poet, novelist (b. 1861)
  - Alexandre Franquet, French admiral (b. 1828)
- August 30 – Richard Mansfield, Anglo-American actor (b. 1857)

=== September ===
- September 4 – Edvard Grieg, Norwegian composer (b. 1843)
- September 6 – Sully Prudhomme, French writer, Nobel Prize laureate (b. 1839)
- September 9 – Ernest Roland Wilberforce, English bishop (b. 1840)
- September 12 – Ilia Chavchavadze, Georgian writer, Orthodox priest and saint (b. 1837)
- September 13 – John Mushmouth Johnson, American gambler (b. 1856)
- September 15 – William Wales (optician), English-American inventor (b. c. 1838)
- September 19 – Jacob Morenga, Namibian rebel leader (b. 1875)
- September 22 – Wilbur Olin Atwater, American chemist (b. 1844)
- September 30 – Sir John Ardagh, British army general (b. 1840)

=== October ===
- October 10 – Adolf Furtwängler, German archaeologist, historian (b. 1853)
- October 30 – Caroline Dana Howe, American author (b. 1824)

=== November ===
- November 1 – Alfred Jarry, French writer (b. 1873)
- November 6 – Sir James Hector, Scottish geologist (b. 1834)
- November 14 – Andrew Inglis Clark, Australian jurist and politician (b. 1848)
- November 15 – Raphael Kalinowski, Polish Discalced Carmelite friar and saint (b. 1835)
- November 16 – Robert I, Duke of Parma, last ruling Duke of Parma (b. 1848)
- November 17 – Sir Francis McClintock, Irish explorer and admiral in British Royal Navy (b. 1819)
- November 20 – Paula Modersohn-Becker, German painter (b. 1876)
- November 22 – Asaph Hall, American astronomer (b. 1829)
- November 23 – Naimuddin, Bengali writer and Islamic scholar (b. 1832)
- November 25 – Ludvig Mylius-Erichsen, Danish explorer (b. 1872)
- November 28 – Stanisław Wyspiański, Polish writer, painter and architect (b. 1869)
- November 30 – Ludwig Levy, German architect (b. 1854)

=== December ===
- December 4 – Luis Sáenz Peña, 12th President of Argentina (b. 1822)
- December 8 – King Oscar II of Sweden (b. 1829)
- December 15 – Carola of Vasa, queen consort of Saxony (b. 1833)
- December 17 – William Thomson, 1st Baron Kelvin, Irish-born physicist and engineer (b. 1824)
- December 20 – Helen Louisa Bostwick Bird, American author (b. 1826)
- December 21 – Klara Hitler, Austrian mother of Adolf Hitler (b. 1860)
- December 23 – Pierre Janssen, French astronomer (b. 1824)
- December 28 – Kate Stone, American diarist (b. 1841)
- December 31 – Jules de Trooz, 18th Prime Minister of Belgium (b. 1857)

=== Date unknown ===
- Ellen Russell Emerson, American ethnologist (b. 1837)
- Sarah Gibson Humphreys, American author and suffragist (b. 1830)
- Joseph Stannah, Founder of Stannah Lifts (b. 1836)

== Nobel Prizes ==

- Physics – Albert Abraham Michelson
- Chemistry – Eduard Buchner
- Medicine – Charles Louis Alphonse Laveran
- Literature – Rudyard Kipling
- Peace – Ernesto Teodoro Moneta, Louis Renault
