= John Mushmouth Johnson =

American gambler and entrepreneur (1856–1907)

John "Mushmouth" Johnson
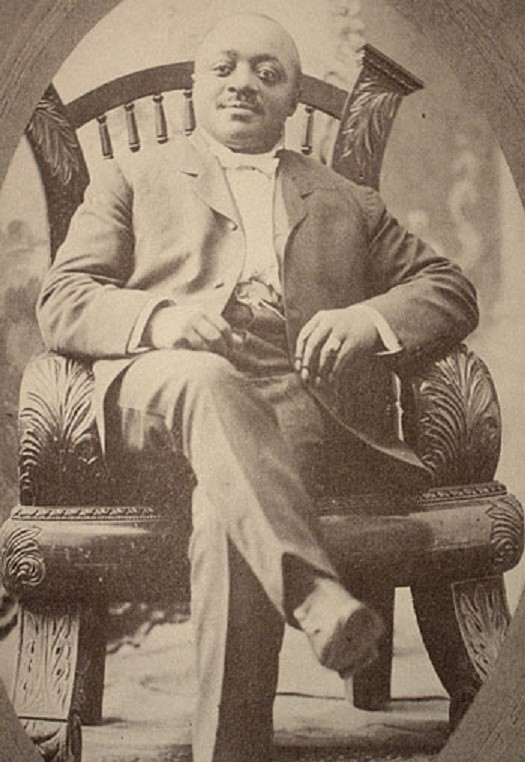
- Johnson sitting in a chair, c. 1903
- Born: John V. Johnson; 1856; Saint Louis, Missouri, U.S.
- Died: September 13, 1907 (aged 50–51); Brooklyn, New York City, U.S.
- Other names: Negro Gambling King of Chicago; Black Gambling King of Chicago
- Occupations: Gambler; entrepreneur
- Years active: 1882–1907
- Known for: Running illegal gambling business in Chicago

John V. "Mushmouth" Johnson (1856 – September 13, 1907) was an American gambler and entrepreneur known for running illegal gambling businesses in Chicago. One of the main players in the Policy game, he died in 1907, about 17 years after establishing his business. His gambling businesses were open to all visitors. An African American, he was the first gambling king of Chicago. He also started a musical hub and coffee house named Dreamland Cafe.

Johnson, along with Policy Sam, were the organizers of the Policy game originating in Chicago, and popularizing it, continuing from the 1880s and ending sometime in the 1970s, a timeline often termed as Policy era. His gambling houses attracted massive numbers of people, and even appearing on the main contemporary presses such as The Chicago Defender and Chicago Tribune; Tribune considered in June 1897, The Emporium to be the most popular gambling house in Chicago. His business was often visited by the enterprise-owner Robert T. Motts, who was the owner of Pekin Theater, the first black theater in the world.

== Policy game in Chicago ==
Samuel "Policy Sam" Young started an illegal gambling movement in Chicago known as the "Policy game", in 1885. In the game, players tried to guess three numbers ranging from 1 to 78. Dozens of wheels (roulettes) spun at a time. In the game, players would bet very little money, often a penny or nickel on many number combinations. Winners were declared twice a day. If three numbers were pulled and they matched to the ones betted on, a nickel on each one won US$100. One of the main gamblers and players in the policy game (known as Policy Kings) was John "Mushmouth" Johnson.

== Biography ==
John "Mushmouth" Johnson was born in Saint Louis, Missouri, United States. He was given the nickname "Mushmouth" during his childhood. He permanently moved to Chicago in 1875 and got the job of a waiter in the Palmer House Hotel.

Before completing much of his formal education, Johnson worked as a railway porter. Soon, Johnson got the job as a porter at a gambling house in Chicago, called Andy Scott's gambling house, in 1882, at about the age of 26. Having no experience as a gambler, Johnson steadily learned the gambling business while working. He started taking part in the policy game. Collaborating with George Whiting and Al Bryant, he opened his own nickel-gambling house at 311 South Clark Street.

In 1890, Johnson quit his job, sold his previous gambling house and, with his collected money from the job, bought a saloon on 464 South State Street, on a street called the "Whiskey Row", and named it The Emporium. He operated in The Emporium, marking the start of his major real estate business and his illegal gambling business. Johnson never changed locations and continued his activities there until his death. The Emporium had three-stories and decorated with a chandelier and Honduran-style bar. Each floor had its own unique style. The first floor had billiards, the second had roulettes, the third had poker tables, and a bar serving whiskey and beer. During this time, Johnson started playing the policy game.

The Emporium and the whole South State Street fell into the heavily guarded First ward. It was guarded by two high-ranking English aldermen, John "Bathhouse" Coughlin and Mike "Hinky Dink" Kenna. The two corrupt members were called Leeve Lords, and had a big hand in both the gambling business and politics of Chicago. In the 1894 elections, they tasked Johnson with bringing 100 votes in their name or closing his building. Johnson having strong links with Chicago politics, collected up to US$150 weekly from gambling hubs in exchange for protecting them from police. He paid some more than the collected money, which he used to bribe the aldermen. Whenever a mayor campaign was conducted in Chicago, Johnson gave US$10,000 to the Republicans and US$10,000 to the Democrats to grant him protection irrelevant of the winning candidate. Chicago's mayor at the time, Carter Harrison Jr., conducted fake raids in order to mitigate pressure from the public, pressuring him for an investigation. Johnson's paid contributions (bribery) to the aldermen's organizations protected his gambling houses from police raids under their jurisdiction and ensured him of early warnings if any necessary police raids were to happen in the future. He would have time to fix the correlative problems in the gambling house.

On June 12, 1903, a twenty-eight-year-old cashier from Sri Lanka (Ceylon) gambled in The Emporium, where he lost a significant amount of money and got into a US$3,000 debt, the money which he had used from his employer's company. His name was Earnest Naoroji and worked in the office of his employer Edward Rueb. When Rueb went to check his Prairie State Bank account, he found only US$110, insufficient for the money he had borrowed. While Rueb was counting Naoroji's money, Naoroji pulled out a revolver from his pocket and shot himself in the head, committing suicide. While talking to the press, Rueb exclaimed that Naoroji lost all his money playing poker in Johnson's business, which he said to have robbed many young people. This matter suggested the Chicago police to close Johnson's business for running an alleged "illegal gambling house." The chief of police at the time found Naoroji's death to have occurred some time ago, when Johnson's Emporium was not orchestrating any forms of gambling and was inactive.

In 1903, Johnson purchased the building opposite to The Emporium for US$40,000. After a few months, a gambler named Thomas Hawkins had a dispute with Johnson; Johnson refusing to acknowledge his winnings. He visited Johnson several times for getting the US$18.75 he was not given. After visiting many times, Hawkins punched Johnson in his face, and knocked him down four times, shattering his glasses and hospitalizing him briefly. Hawkins was arrested by Policeman James Costello, and charged with assault and disorderly conduct. Hawkins was visited by a man the next day who warned him not to go to Johnson for a few days, telling him of chances of death. Hawkins the same day returned to The Emporium. Johnson's associate, a person named Moses Love shot Hawkins once in the shoulder and once in the leg becoming enraged, which he survived and later accused Love of following Johnson's orders. Johnson immediately after recovering, became an informer of the police. His Emporium was raided by police several times. Hawkins starting working with the police, soon filed an illegal gambling investigation in The Emporium. In an interview with Chicago Tribune, he denied the charges. Two days later the state canceled The Emporium's license by Johnson. Johnson financially recovered not long after. In December 1903, The Iroquois Theater Fire, engulfed the theater in flames, diverting the authorities from a while, allowing Johnson to reinstate the working of The Emporium.

In 1906, Johnson opened The Frontenac, a gambling house in Leeve district of Chicago. Then he entered into friendship with Tom McGinnis, a gambling king in the First Ward and several powerful organized crime syndicates operating in the policy game. His second business established, Johnson's businesses were approached by all types of people, rich or poor or people of less honor and wealth. He introduced a new method of gambling in which the players would bet against each other for winning the highest money. Johnson dressed in formal clothes, and always the same; and spoke carefully. He was not extravagant in spending his money. Some of his customers accused his gambling houses for cheating.

In July, 1907, his sister Cecilia Johnson was beginning studying history in University of Chicago in a sorority, where being black in color, she was never met with trouble for at least five years. Earlier, she was acknowledged as being a good learner and intelligent for much time. On July 26, she was pointed for being black, which was not known by most of her classmates, and running purely on wealth. Johnson disregarded the claims and criticized Chicago. The claims marked an end to the university's sorority. Cecilia was elected as president of a sorority arranged by her Englewood High School. Cecilia stayed in the university to learn music and earn a musical degree.

On September 13, 1907, only a few months after the claims, Johnson was going on a train trip from Atlantic City in New Jersey to Kentucky, next he wanted to go to New York to visit his lady friend Miss Mont. While on the train, he was diagnosed with pneumonia and deteriorating health. His family planned to return to Chicago by train after recovering. He was taken by the train to New York City to recover his health. Johnson died while still on the moving train in Brooklyn, New York City. His burial was attended by a huge number of people. His net wealth at the time was claimed to be between US$250,000 (equivalent to $8,638,393 in 2025), and US$500,000 (equivalent to $17,276,786 in 2025).

== Philanthropy ==
Johnson himself almost never worked as a philanthropist. Instead, he gave money to his family members to make donations to charities and to the Chicagoan African-American communities. He spent his money with care and much on the conditions and benefits of his own family. He built a house for them at 5830 South Wabash, in a residential area nearby to the University of Chicago. He contributed to black charities through his mother and the Bethesda Baptist Church where she worked. He paid for the advancement and for learning music for his sister Cecilia, who completed Englewood High School in 1902 and entered the Chicago University in fall (autumn) of 1902, her fees being paid by Johnson.

Johnson gained access in the Republican politics of Chicago and to limited extent in Illinois politics. His friend, Colonel John R. Marshall came to Chicago as a bricklayer in 1880. He then worked into increasing the power of Illinois' black militia, known as the Eight Illinois group, remaining for decades. Governor Tanner promoted him into a colonel for his achievement and gave him control of the regiment. Some of the regiment members went to Cuba while some stayed in Illinois, promoting patriotism. In 1899, Tanner promoted him into an assistant sheriff. He had to resign in 1902. Johnson was able to nominate Marshall for county commissioner through the state Republican party.

== Legacy ==
The inheritance left behind by Johnson was divided among his family members. Johnson never wrote a will. Eudora Johnson, his sister, inherited 60%, and the rest 40% of the fortune was divided between his sisters Louise Johnson and Cecilia Johnson, and his brother Elijah Johnson. Many of Mushmouth's family members and their associates made financial contributions to the black community of Chicago, much from Johnson's collected wealth.

Johnson's sister Eudora Johnson became known throughout Chicago for the large articles John Johnson and his business was featured in. Eudora Johnson married to Jesse Binga, a leading black entrepreneur of Chicago in 1912, described in the front page headline of a Chicago Defender article as "Binga-Johnson Wedding the Most Brilliant Ever Held in Chicago".

Binga became wealthy by marrying Eudora, which he used with his previous entrepreneurship ideas, to set up a private bank on 3637 South State Street. His bank remained all-time popular among the black Chicagoan community towards the end-1910s and 1920s. In the year 1929, marking the start of Great Depression, the economic downfall led to his bank being shut down. He was tried in court respectively in 1932 and July 1933 for embezzlement charges, released both times without imprisonment. His wife Eudora died in 1933. In 1935, he was given a 10-year sentence for embezzlement. He was released from getting pardoned by protests from Chicago in 1938. Binga died on June 13, 1950.

== Citations ==
=== References ===
- Bauman, Thomas (2014). The Pekin: The Rise and Fall of Chicago's First Black-Owned Theater. University of Illinois Press. ISBN 978-0-252-09624-2.
- Chepesiuk, Ron (2007). Black Gangsters of Chicago. Barricade Books. ISBN 978-1-56980-331-8.
- Newman, Roberta J.; Rosen, Joel Nathan (2014). Black Baseball, Black Business. University Press of Mississippi. ISBN 978-1-61703-955-3.
- Travis, Dempsey Jerome (1987). An autobiography of Black politics. Vol. 1. Introduction by Paul Simon. Chicago: Urban Research Press Institute. ISBN 0-941484-05-X.
- Branham, Charles Russel (November 25, 1981). The Transformation of Black Political Leadership in Chicago, 1864-1942. University of Chicago Press.
