= Jesse Binga =

American businessman & banker (1865-1950)

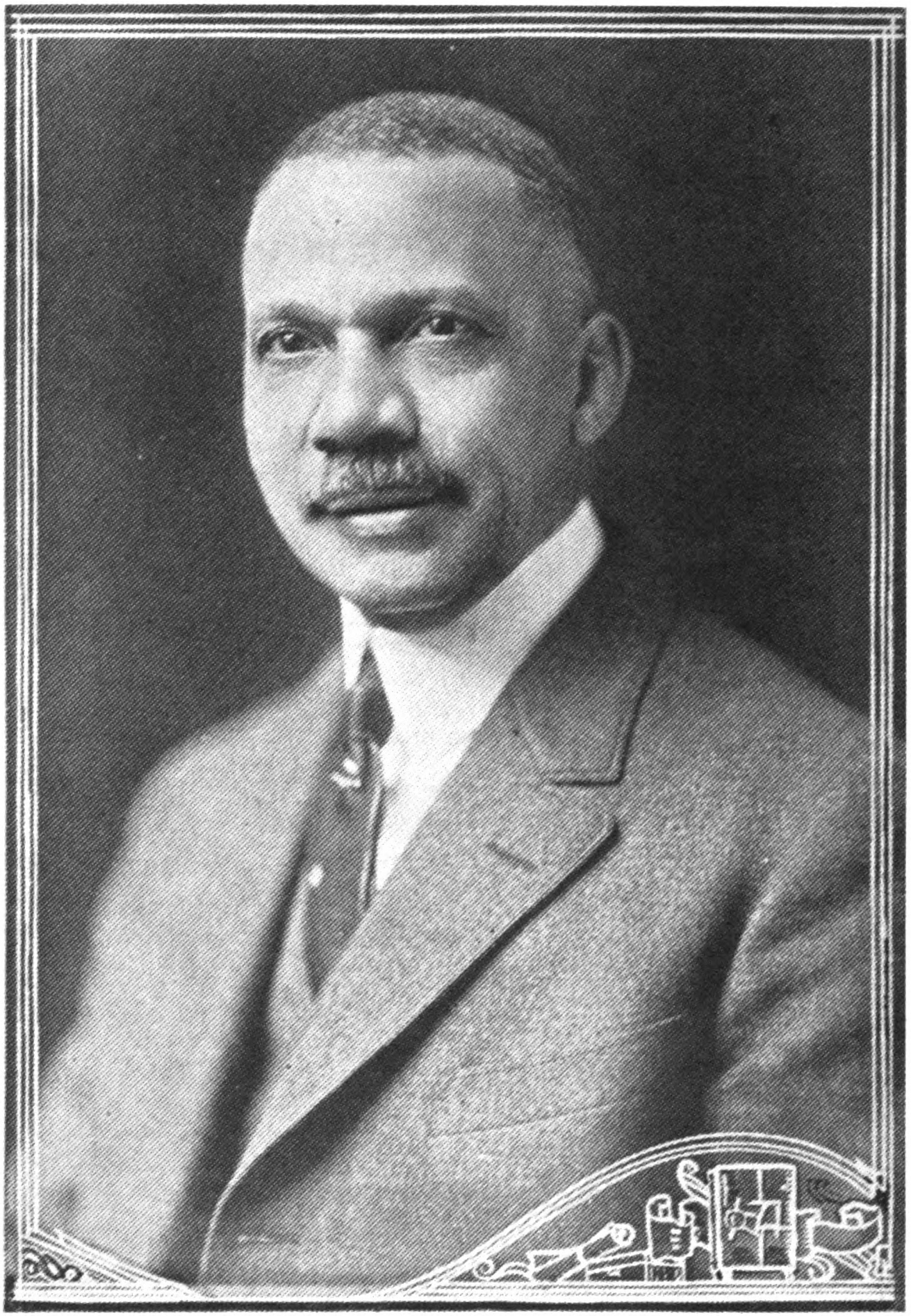
Binga c. 1923

Jesse Binga (April 10, 1865 – June 13, 1950) was a prominent American businessman who founded the first privately owned African-American bank in Chicago. Binga recalled coming to Chicago in the 1890s with $10 in his pocket. By the 1920s he was a bank president and major real estate owner. Unwilling to conform to de facto, private real-estate segregation, white real estate interests sometimes opposed him violently. After his bank failed in the Great Depression, Binga was eventually charged with embezzlement, a controversial prosecution in the African American community. Protests and public petitions helped lead to his early release. He was granted a full pardon in 1941.

== Early life ==
Binga was born in Detroit, Michigan, in 1865, the son of a barbershop owner and the youngest of ten children. He learned barbering, helped his mother to collect rents and made property repairs. He dropped out of high school to work in the office of Thomas Crispus, an African-American attorney. Despite business opportunities in Detroit he traveled westwards, employed in various jobs and cities. He made a profit from buying land on a former Indian reservation in Idaho. He arrived in Chicago in 1893 for the World's Columbian Exposition and remained, having various jobs and eventually starting a real estate business between 1896 and 1898.

== Significance of city influence ==
At the turn of the century less than 2% of the total population of Chicago was made up of African Americans, which is around 20,000 people. Most of which were densely populated in the "Black Belt" district, which covered a few blocks in each direction from State Street south 22nd Street to 35th Street. However, this was about to change as many African Americans began migrating to Northern cities due to the harsh prejudices of Jim Crow segregation, Ku Klux Klan persecution, and poor agricultural employment opportunities in the South. The mass circulation of Chicago's popular African-American newspaper the "Chicago Defender", brought the city to the attention of those seeking promising occupations and inexpensive housing. It was these new migrants that made up the majority of Binga's early clientele.

== Realtor ==
As a realtor he purchased run down properties which he repaired, renovated, and maintained himself. He was then able to rent them out at a premium due to the influx of African-Americans from the south. In 1905 he took out a long-term lease on the Bates apartment building which resulted in the tenants who were all white, to leave. He expanded his business plan continuing to prosper to the point where he was able to consider opening a bank. Binga was known for philanthropy and was an honorary member of Alpha Phi Alpha fraternity, but he was also described as a mean landlord to low income families by charging them the highest rents. Binga became even wealthier after his marriage to Eudora Johnson a relative of John "Mushmouth" Johnson, the city's gambling kingpin. When Johnson died in 1907, Eudora inherited $200,000 Eventually Binga and his wife bought a house at 5922 South Park Avenue, which is now known as King Drive. This was a strictly white neighborhood and his house and offices were bombed on at least five occasions. Binga shrugged off these attacks and became even more popular amongst African-Americans and continued to prosper, attaining around 1200 property leaseholds.

== The Binga Bank ==
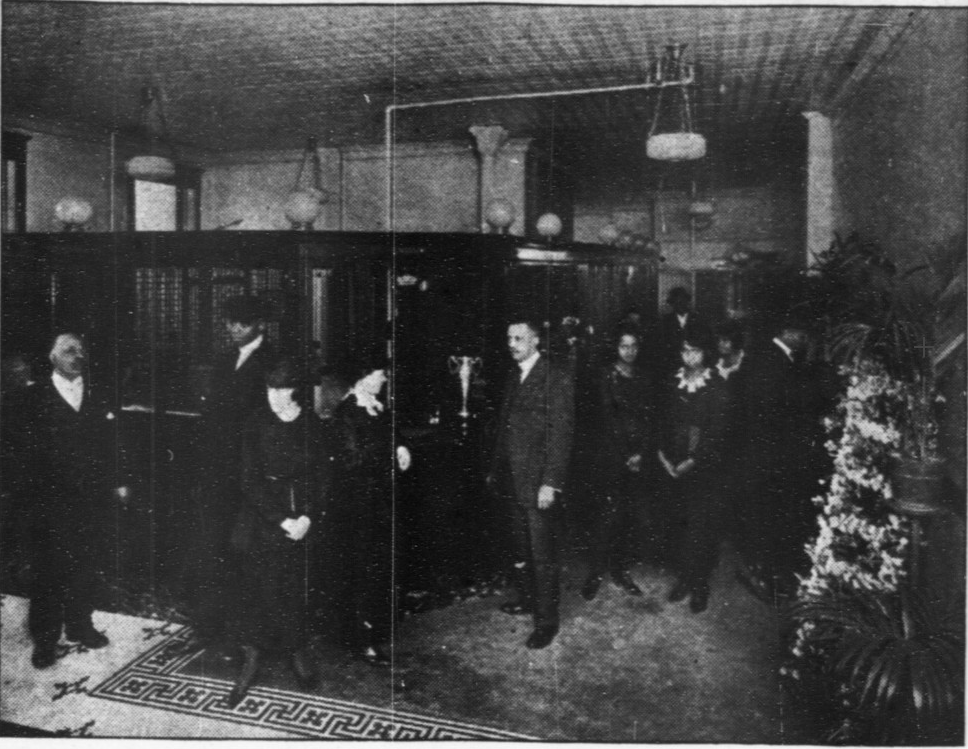
Binga Bank on opening day (January 3, 1921). Jesse Binga is fifth from left.

Binga founded a private bank in 1908, primarily for African-Americans, mainly because many banks excluded them. It was the first bank to be owned and run by African-Americans in the north. As the bank grew, other African-American businesses grew up around it and the area became the center of black business development on Chicago South side. When the Great Migration came, Binga grew ever more popular because he could provide a service to the black community where previously they had been discriminated against.Eventually Binga got a state charter for his bank and opened The Binga State Bank in 1921 which relocated to new imposing offices in 1924. Despite the bank's new status, he still remained the largest shareholder and his tendency to act impetuously was a personal trait that annoyed his board of directors and would come to play a part in his downfall.

== The Depression ==
In 1929 the US stock market collapsed and the Great Depression began. Despite the recession Binga completed the construction of a luxurious $325,000 five story office block complete with a rooftop ballroom, known as the Binga Arcade. He had hoped that this investment would revitalize the area of 35th and State streets. However, this wasn't to be and it has been described as being built in the wrong place at the wrong time for financial success, relying too heavily on revenue from rental income. Binga was still outwardly full of confidence announcing his intention to start a new South Park National Bank, but his fortunes were about to change as he sought support to meet the bank's financial commitments. He was able to gain an offer of financial support, but State of Illinois officials required additional payments of $400,000 in cash. Binga then turned to the Chicago Clearing House Association to cover this amount as Binga State Bank was a member, but he was refused. Despite having solid assets, Binga was unable to liquidate these immediately as the banks assets were too heavily invested in mortgage loans to black churches and fraternal societies, many of which could not meet their payments after their members lost their jobs. Binga refused to seize the properties of these community institutions and in June 1930 the Auditor General of the State of Illinois closed the bank down. Binga lost his personal fortune as well as that of many depositors.

== Prison ==
As soon as the bank was closed down, Binga's activities were investigated, leading to criminal charges. He was indicted in March 1931 for embezzlement. The prosecution argued that Binga took out inadequately secured loans to speculate in real estate, but his first trial in 1932 ended in a hung jury. He was then charged with depositing money that was intended for investment in a new bank, into his personal account and when he was tried a second time in 1933, he was found guilty. He was sentenced to ten years in prison and this caused resentment within his community who felt that racism was part of the bank's failure. Clarence Darrow, Binga's attorney, although virtually retired, attempted to persuade a parole board hearing for his early release. He didn't succeed and it was nearly two years later that Binga was paroled from Joliet Prison to the custody of a catholic priest Rev Joseph F Eckert in 1938. Protests and a 10,000 signature petition from the community who themselves had suffered losses in his dealings, were considered a contributory factor in his release.

== Pardon and aftermath ==
His wife had died in 1933 and on his release from prison in 1938, he was given a $15 a week job as a janitor at St. Anselm's Church, spending the remainder of his life in poverty. Binga always maintained his innocence in the affair and was given a full pardon by Gov. Dwight H. Green in 1941. He eventually went to live with his nephew and died June 13, 1950, in St Lukes Hospital. He was buried in Oak Woods Cemetery.

== See also ==
- Anthony Overton
- Chicago Whip
