= Ron Chepesiuk =

Canadian academic and writer

- Born: 1946 (age 79–80); Thunder Bay, Ontario
- Education: Fort William Collegiate Institute
- Occupations: Author, journalist
- Writing career
- Genre: True crime
- Notable awards: Humphrey/OCLC/Forest Press Award; Independent Publisher Book Awards
- Website: www.ronchepesiuk.com

Ronald Joseph Chepesiuk (born 1946) is a Canadian and American journalist and author of true crime books. He is a former academic and professor and also has credits in documentary film production and writing.

== Biography ==
Chepesiuk was born in 1946 in Thunder Bay, Ontario. He graduated from Fort William Collegiate Institute before moving to the United States at 20 years old. He worked at Winthrop University in South Carolina as a professor of library service and head of archives and special collections for 25 years. He also worked as an adjunct professor at the University of California, Los Angeles. In 2002, he served as a Fulbright Scholar and visiting professor of journalism at the University of Chittagong in Bangladesh.

When he was 38, he sold his first article as a freelance writer. He wrote an article about the first marathon held in Belfast and sold it to a British publication. After marrying a woman from Colombia and spending time in the country, he began work on a book about the Cali Cartel. After publishing it, he wrote a book about gangs in Harlem, New York, and from that point became an established writer of true crime nonfiction books. By 2026, he had written 47 books, 28 screenplays, and thousands of articles. Rolling Stone described Chepesiuk as "one of the most popular American crime journalists".

In 1999, Chepesiuk received the Humphrey/OCLC/Forest Press Award for significant contribution to international librarianship. In 2008, he won the silver Independent Publisher Book Award for true crime. He won bronze in the same category in 2011.
