= Salvador González Morales =

Mexican catholic bishop

The Most Reverend Salvador González Morales
- Bishop of Cancún-Chetumal
- Diocese: Cancún-Chetumal
- Appointed: December 6, 2025
- Predecessor: Pedro Pablo Elizondo Cárdenas, L.C.
- Previous posts: Auxiliary Bishop of Mexico and Titular Bishop of Lacubaza (2019-2025)

Orders
- Ordination: May 18, 2002 by Norberto Rivera Carrera
- Consecration: March 25, 2019 by Carlos Aguiar Retes, Franco Coppola, and Andrés Vargas Peña

Personal details
- Born: December 20, 1971 (age 54) Mexico City, Mexico
- Education: Instituto Politécnico Nacional; Conciliar Seminary of Mexico; Pontifical Gregorian University
- Motto: Secundum Verbum Tuum

Styles of Salvador González Morales
- Reference style: His Excellency; The Most Reverend
- Spoken style: Your Excellency
- Religious style: Bishop

Salvador González Morales (born December 20, 1971) is a Mexican Catholic prelate serving as the second bishop of the Diocese of Cancún-Chetumal in Mexico since 2025. Morales was previously an auxiliary bishop for the Archdiocese of Mexico since 2019.

== Biography ==
=== Early life ===
Morales was born in the Iztacalco borough of Mexico City. He is the second of three children of Salvador González and María de Lourdes Morales. Morales studied food engineering at Mexico's National Polytechnic Institute. In preparing to be a Catholic priest, Morales attended seminary at the Conciliar Seminary of Mexico.

=== Priesthood ===
Morales was ordained a priest for the Archdiocese of Mexico in Mexico City on May 18, 2002. Morales began a licentiate program immediately following his ordination and completed his studies at the Gregorianum in Rome in 2004. He completed further studies at the Superior Institute of Ecclesiastical Studies in 2005.

He spent much of his priesthood supporting higher education, but he also worked in parish ministry. He served as vice-rector of the Conciliar Seminary of Mexico from 2007 to 2011. From 2012 to 2014, he oversaw a bachelor's degree program at the Pontifical University of Mexico and coordinated a master's degree in philosophy at the Universidad Catolica Lumen Gentium from 2014 to 2016. From 2014 until his appointment as auxiliary bishop, he served variously as parochial vicar, pastor, and a dean within the Archdiocese of Mexico.

=== Episcopacy ===
==== Auxiliary of Mexico ====
In 2019, Pope Francis appointed Morales an auxiliary bishop of Mexico. As an auxiliary bishop, he served as vicar general for the archdiocese. Morales's service in the Archdiocese of Mexico is remembered as a faithful, generous, and responsible, and he received praise from the Episcopal Conference of Mexico. Morales is thought to be in the inner circle of Cardinal Carlos Aguiar Retes.

==== Ordinary of Cancún-Chetumal ====
Pope Leo XIV appointed Morales bishop of Cancún-Chetumal on December 6, 2025, succeeding Pedro Pablo Elizondo Cárdenas, L.C. This appointment comes as Cancún experiences a growing population.

Morales is the first bishop of that diocese who is not a member of the Legionaries of Christ. The former Legionary bishop of Cancún-Chetumal, Pedro Pablo, is known to have "rescued" the diocese during a period of cultural change in the Yucatan region and is well regarded. However, Legionaries have been surrounded by controversies, and some reporters take Morales's appointment as signaling change in the diocese. Legionaries make up over a third of all priests in the Diocese of Cancún-Chetumal, and Morales ordained several Mexican Legionary priests and deacons as an auxiliary bishop.

== Coat of Arms and Motto ==
Morales's coat of arms reflects devotion to Our Lady of Guadalupe by its colors and symbols. His arms contain the seal of Iztacalco, his birthplace. His episcopal motto Secundum Verbum tuum (Spanish: Según tu Palabra; English: According to your Word) is from the Annunciation in Luke's Gospel.
