= Archdiocese of Mexico =

Latin Catholic jurisdiction in Mexico

Coordinates: 19.4344°N 99.1331°W

Archdiocese of Mexico Archidioecesis Mexicanensis Arquidiócesis de México (Spanish) Iarchdiocese Mexiko (Nahuatl)
- Coat of Arms of the Archdiocese of Mexico

Location
- Country: Mexico
- Ecclesiastical province: Mexico

Statistics
- Area: 799.8 km^{2} (308.8 sq mi)
- Population: Total; Catholics: (as of 2019); 5,265,309; 4,212,247 (80%)
- Parishes: 307

Information
- Denomination: Catholic Church
- Sui iuris church: Latin Church
- Rite: Roman Rite
- Established: 2 September 1530 (496 years ago)
- Cathedral: Metropolitan Cathedral of the Assumption of the Most Blessed Virgin Mary into Heaven

Current leadership
- Pope: Leo XIV
- Archbishop: Carlos Aguiar Retes
- Auxiliary Bishops: Francisco Javier Acero Pérez; Andrés Luis García Jasso; Salvador González Morales; Luis Manuel Pérez Raygoza; Héctor Mario Pérez Villarreal; Carlos Enrique Samaniego López
- Bishops emeritus: Norberto Rivera Carrera; Francisco Clavel Gil; José Luis Fletes Santana

Map

Website
- www.arquidiocesismexico.org.mx

The Archdiocese of Mexico (Latin: Archidioecesis Mexicanensis) is a Latin Church ecclesiastical territory or archdiocese of the Catholic Church that is situated in Mexico City, Mexico. It was erected as a diocese on 2 September 1530 and elevated to an archdiocese on 12 February 1546. The archdiocese is one of the largest in the world, with over four million Catholics, surpassed only by Kinshasa, Guadalajara, São Paulo, Puebla de los Ángeles, Santiago de Guatemala, and Milan.

Prior to 2019, the archdiocese was the largest in the world, with nearly 8 million Catholics. In September 2019, Pope Francis approved the division of the archdiocese, erecting three new suffragan dioceses from its territory: Azcapotzalco, Iztapalapa, and Xochimilco. These are the only three suffragans within the ecclesiastical province of which the archdiocese is the metropolitan see. The diocese's previous suffragans (Atlacomulco, Cuernavaca, and Tenancingo) were made suffragan of Toluca, which was raise to Archdiocese status. Today, the archdiocese's territory comprises most of Mexico City, with the exception of the three new dioceses, each of which is coextensive with its eponymous borough.

The cathedra of the archdiocese is found within the Metropolitan Cathedral in Mexico City.

== Bishops ==
=== Ordinaries ===
| No. | Name | From | Until |
|---|---|---|---|
| 1 | Juan de Zumárraga, O.F.M. | August 20, 1530 | June 3, 1548 |
| 2 | Alonso de Montúfar, O.P. | October 5, 1551 | March 7, 1572 |
| 3 | Pedro Moya de Contreras | June 17, 1573 | December 7, 1591 |
| 4 | Alfonso Fernández de Bonilla | May 22, 1592 | 1600 |
| 5 | García de Santa María Mendoza y Zúñiga, O.S.H. | February 12, 1601 | October 5, 1606 |
| 6 | García Guerra, O.P. | December 3, 1607 | February 22, 1612 |
| 7 | Juan Pérez de la Serna | May 13, 1613 | July 19, 1627 |
| 8 | Francisco de Manso Zuñiga y Sola | August 9, 1627 | July 20, 1634 |
| 9 | Francisco Verdugo Cabrera | September 9, 1636 | ? |
| 10 | Feliciano de la Vega Padilla | March 22, 1639 | December 1640 |
| 11 | Juan de Mañozca y Zamora | November 16, 1643 | December 12, 1650 |
| 12 | Marcelo Lopez de Azcona | April 29, 1652 | November 10, 1654 |
| 13 | Mateo de Sagade de Bugueyro | September 19, 1655 | June 1664 |
| 14 | Juan Alonso de Cuevas y Davalos | April 28, 1664 | September 2, 1665 |
| 15 | Marcos Ramírez de Prado y Ovando, O.F.M. | December 15, 1666 | March 14, 1667 |
| 16 | Payo Enríquez de Rivera, O.S.A. | September 17, 1668 | June 30, 1681 |
| 17 | Francisco de Aguiar y Seijas y Ulloa | August 20, 1682 | August 16, 1698 |
| 18 | Juan de Ortega Cano Montañez y Patiño | 1699 | December 16, 1708 |
| 19 | José Pérez de Lanciego Eguiluz y Mirafuentes, O.S.B. | March 21, 1714 | January 25, 1728 |
| 20 | Manuel José de Hendaya y Haro | 1728 | 1729 |
| 21 | Juan Antonio de Vizarrón y Eguiarreta | July 24, 1730 | January 25, 1747 |
| 22 | Manuel José Rubio y Salinas | January 29, 1748 | July 3, 1765 |
| 23 | Francisco Antonio de Lorenzana y Butrón | April 14, 1766 | August 22, 1771 |
| 24 | Alonso Núñez de Haro y Peralta | March 30, 1772 | May 26, 1800 |
| 25 | Francisco Javier de Lizana y Beaumont | May 24, 1802 | January 1, 1815 |
| 26 | Pedro José de Fonte y Hernández Miravete | September 4, 1815 | December 28, 1837 |
| 27 | Manuel Posada y Garduño | December 23, 1839 | April 30, 1846 |
| 28 | José Lázaro de la Garza y Ballesteros | September 30, 1850 | March 11, 1862 |
| 29 | Pelagio Antonio de Labastida y Dávalos | March 19, 1863 | February 4, 1891 |
| 30 | Próspero María Alarcón y Sánchez de la Barquera | December 17, 1891 | March 29, 1908 |
| 31 | José Mora y del Rio | December 2, 1908 | April 22, 1928 |
| 32 | Pascual Díaz y Barreto, S.J. | June 25, 1929 | May 19, 1936 |
| 33 | Luis María Martínez y Rodríguez | February 20, 1937 | February 9, 1956 |
| 34 | Miguel Darío Miranda y Gómez | June 28, 1956 | July 19, 1977 |
| 35 | Ernesto Corripio y Ahumada | July 19, 1977 | September 29, 1994 |
| 36 | Norberto Rivera Carrera | June 13, 1995 | December 7, 2017 |
| 37 | Carlos Aguiar Retes | December 7, 2017 | present |

Ordinaries who became Cardinals:

- Miguel Darío Miranda y Gómez, in 1969
- Ernesto Corripio y Ahumada, in 1979
- Norberto Rivera Carrera, in 1998
- Carlos Aguiar Retes, in 2016 while Archbishop of Tlalnepantla

=== Coadjutor archbishop ===
- Miguel Darío Cardinal Miranda y Gómez (1955–1956); future Cardinal

=== Current auxiliary bishops ===
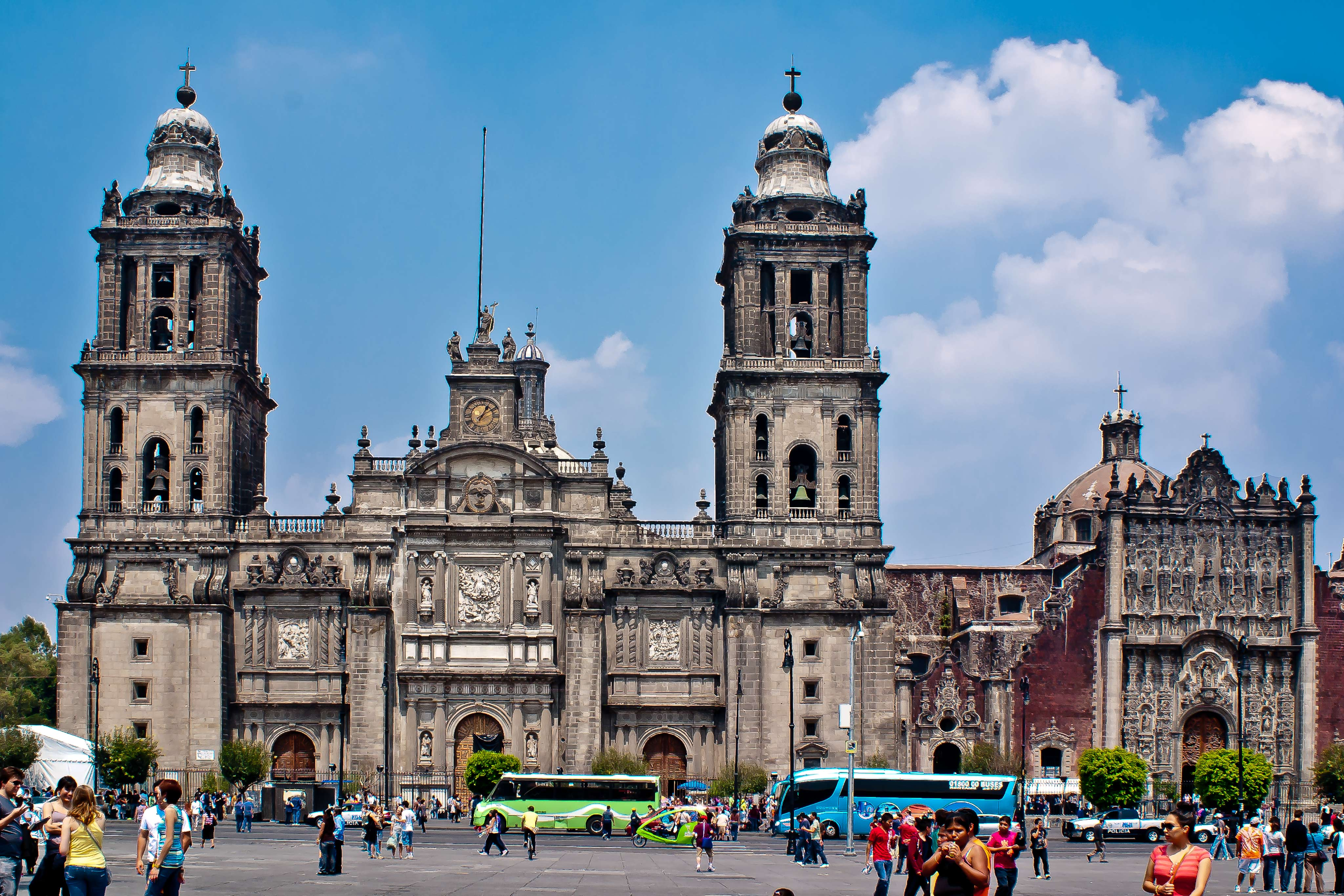
Metropolitan Cathedral in Mexico City

- Luis Manuel Pérez Raygoza (appointed 25 January 2020)
- Héctor Mario Pérez Villarreal (appointed 25 January 2020)
- Andrés Luis García Jasso (appointed 24 Aug 2021)
- Francisco Javier Acero Pérez, O.A.R. (appointed 18 November 2022)

=== Former auxiliary bishops ===
- Juan Manuel de Irrizarri y Peralta (27 April 1840 – 27 March 1849)
- Maximino Ruiz y Flores (8 March 1920 – 11 May 1949)
- Francisco Orozco Lomelín (19 March 1952 – 17 October 1990)
- José Villalón Mercado (1 April 1952 – 12 September 1977)
- Alfredo Torres Romero (30 December 1967 – 4 January 1975), appointed Coadjutor Bishop of Aguascalientes
- Luis Mena Arroyo (13 July 1961 – 1 September 1964), appointed Coadjutor Archbishop of Chihuahua; returned here as Auxiliary Bishop (27 July 1979 – 9 September 1995), with personal title of Archbishop
- Jorge Martínez Martínez (5 June 1971 – 1 August 1994)
- Javier Lozano Barragán (5 June 1979 – 28 October 1984), appointed Bishop of Zacatecas; future Cardinal
- Francisco María Aguilera González (5 June 1979 – 12 January 1996)
- Carlos Talavera Ramírez (15 January 1980 – 14 March 1984), appointed Bishop of Coatzacoalcos, Veracruz
- Genaro Alamilla Arteaga (26 January 1980 – 10 October 1989)
- Ricardo Watty Urquidi, M.Sp.S. (27 May 1980 – 6 November 1989), appointed Bishop of Nuevo Laredo, Tamaulipas
- Abelardo Alvarado Alcántara (26 April 1985 – 22 July 2008)
- José de Jesús Martínez Zepeda (11 March 1997 – 3 January 2004), appointed Bishop of Irapuato, Guanajuato
- Marcelino Hernández Rodríguez (5 January 1998 – 23 February 2008), appointed Bishop of Orizaba, Veracruz
- José Luis Fletes Santana (29 January 2000 – 31 May 2003)
- Guillermo Rodrigo Teodoro Ortiz Mondragón (29 January 2000 – 19 October 2005), appointed Bishop of Cuautitlán, México
- Rogelio Esquivel Medina (27 June 2001 – 27 June 2008)
- Felipe Tejeda García, M.Sp.S. (29 January 2000 – 30 July 2010)
- Jonás Guerrero Corona (27 June 2001 – 18 March 2011), appointed Bishop of Culiacán, Sinaloa
- Francisco Clavel Gil (27 June 2001 – 28 May 2013)
- Antonio Ortega Franco, C.O. (11 February 2004 – 16 February 2019)
- José Víctor Manuel Valentín Sánchez Espinosa (2 March 2004 – 5 February 2009), appointed Archbishop of Puebla de los Ángeles, Puebla
- Carlos Briseño Arch, O.A.R. (20 May 2006 – 12 November 2018), appointed Bishop of Veracruz
- Florencio Armando Colín Cruz (27 November 2008 – 16 February 2019), appointed Bishop of Puerto Escondido, Oaxaca
- Jesús Antonio Lerma Nolasco (7 May 2009 – 28 September 2019), appointed Bishop of Iztapalapa
- Crispin Ojeda Márquez (4 June 2011 – 27 July 2018), appointed Bishop of Tehuantepec, Oaxaca
- Jorge Estrada Solórzano (28 May 2013 – 11 May 2019), appointed Bishop of Gómez Palacio, Durango
- Francisco Daniel Rivera Sánchez, M.Sp.S. (25 January 2020 – died 18 January 2021)
- Carlos Enrique Samaniego López (16 February 2019 – 21 August 2025), appointed Bishop of Texcoco
- Salvador González Morales (16 February 2019 – 6 December 2025)

=== Other priests of the archdiocese who became bishops ===
- Bernardo Gárate y López de Arizmendi (15 December 1819 – 19 March 1863), appointed Bishop of Querétaro
- Manuel Fulcheri y Pietrasanta (17 December 1898 – 6 May 1912), appointed Bishop of Cuernavaca
- Gerardo Anaya y Diez de Bonilla (2 April 1904 – 8 March 1920), appointed Bishop of Chiapas (Ciudad Real de Chiapas)
- Arturo Vélez Martínez (29 June 1934 – 8 February 1951), appointed Bishop of Toluca

== Territorial losses ==
| Year | Along with territory from | To form |
|---|---|---|
| 1536 | | Diocese of Michoacán |
| 1579 | | Diocese of Manila |
| 1863 | | Diocese of Tulancingo |
| 1863 | Archdiocese of Michoacán; Diocese of Tlaxcala | Diocese of Chilapa |
| 1870 | Diocese of Tlaxcala; Vicariate Apostolic of Tamaulipas | Diocese of Ciudad Victoria-Tamaulipas |
| 1874 | | Vicariate Apostolic of California Inferiore |
| 1891 | | Diocese of Cuernavaca |
| 1950 | | Diocese of Toluca |
| 1959 | Archdiocese of Puebla de los Angeles, Puebla | Diocese of Tlaxcala |
| 1960 | | Diocese of Texcoco |
| 1961 | Diocese of Tulancingo | Diocese of Tula |
| 1964 | Diocese of Texcoco | Diocese of Tlalnepantla |
| 1984 | | Diocese of Atlacomulco; Diocese of Tenancingo; Diocese of Cuernavaca |
| 2019 | | Diocese of Azcapotzalco; Diocese of Iztapalapa; Diocese of Xochimilco |

== Education ==
=== Colleges, universities, and seminaries ===
| Seal | University | Location | Religious order | Founded |
|---|---|---|---|---|
| | Conciliar Seminary of Mexico | Mexico City | | 1585 |
| | Panamerican University | Mexico City | | 1967 |
| | Simón Bolívar University | Mexico City | | |
| | Universidad Iberoamericana | Mexico City | Society of Jesus | 1943 |
| | Universidad Intercontinental | Mexico City | Guadalupe Missionaries | 1976 |
| | Universidad La Salle | Mexico City | De La Salle Brothers | 1962 |
| | Universidad Pontificia de México | Mexico City | | 1982 |

=== Secondary schools ===
| Seal | School | Location | Religious order | Founded |
|---|---|---|---|---|
| | Colegio Cristóbal Colón | Naucalpan | | 1938 |
| | Colegio del Bosque México | Mexico City | Legion of Christ | 1975 |
| | Colegio La Salle Simón Bolívar | Mexico City | De La Salle Brothers | 1910 |
| | Colegio de San Ignacio de Loyola Vizcaínas | Mexico City | | 1734 |
| | Cumbres Institute | Mexico City | Legion of Christ | 1954 |
| | Irish Institute | Naucalpan | Legion of Christ | 1966 |

=== Former colleges, universities, and seminaries ===
| School | Location | Religious order | Founded | Closed |
|---|---|---|---|---|
| Colegio de Santa Cruz de Tlatelolco | Mexico City | Order of Friars Minor | 1536 | 1555 |
| College of San Fernando de Mexico | Mexico City | Order of Friars Minor | 1734 | |
| Royal and Pontifical University of Mexico | Mexico City | | 1551 | 1865 |
| San Ildefonso College | Mexico City | Society of Jesus | 1588 | 1867 |
| San Pedro y San Pablo College | Mexico City | Society of Jesus | 1574 | 1767 |

== External links and references ==
- Arquidiócesis Primada de México official site (in Spanish)
- "Archdiocese of México". Catholic-Hierarchy.
- Herbermann, Charles, ed. (1913). "Archdiocese of Mexico" . Catholic Encyclopedia. New York: Robert Appleton Company.
