= Convent of La Concepción, Mexico City =

Convent of the Immaculate Conception
- Real Convento de la Purísima y Limpia Concepción
- La Concepción
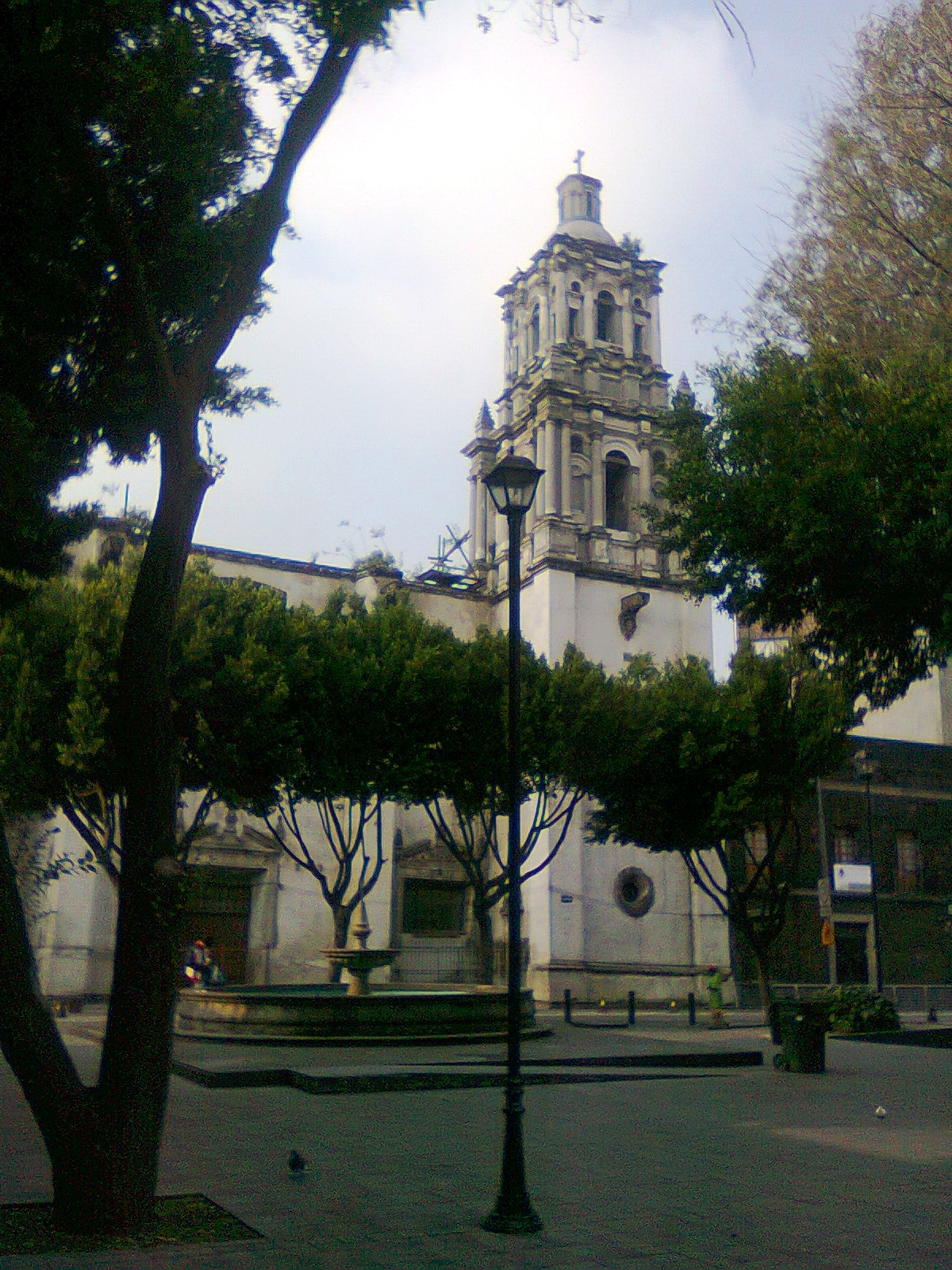
- Belltower as seen from the square.

- 19°26′18″N 99°08′21″W
- Location: Mexico City
- Address: Calle de Belisario Domínguez №7 06010
- Country: Mexico
- Denomination: Roman Catholic
- Religious institute: Conceptionists

History
- Founded: 1530
- Founder: Andrés de Tapia
- Dedication: 1655

Architecture
- Architectural type: Baroque

Administration
- Archdiocese: Archdiocese of Mexico

The Royal Convent of the Most Clean and Most Pure Conception is a church in Mexico City, in its downtown. From the huge complex, only the church remains, along with a minimal fraction of the convent, but in its time it used to be the largest and richest nunnery in the whole city.

== History ==
The site used to belong to conquistador Andrés de Tapia, who in order to found a nunnery donated it to bishop Juan de Zumárraga. 1530 is given as the foundation date, but it wouldn't receive papal approval until 1586.

Practically ruined with the infamous 1629 flood, it was rebuilt under patronage of Tomás de Aguirre y Suasnaba, and after the former's death of Simón de Haro, being finished on October 28, 1655.

It was made Royal on July 16, 1760, recognising its merits as the "mother house" of the Concepcionist nuns in New Spain. All the nuns who would found other convents would come out from it, including La Encarnación and Jesús María in the same city, along with some in Puebla de los Ángeles (la Concepción and Santísima Trinidad), Mérida (Yucatán), Ciudad Real (Chiapas), Santiago de Guatemala, among others.

Just before la Reforma, the convent used to own 132 urban properties, and covered one and a half block.It was suppressed in 1861, the nuns were exclaustrated and the area fractioned and sold.

The church was kept in full service for parishioners, but the convent was practically all demolished. Parking lots, a street, an abandoned cinema, houses, can all be found in the former site of the convent. A middle school is installed in what little remains of the cloister.
