= Dioces of Thysdrus =

The Dioces of Thysdrus (Latin: Dioecesis Thysdritana) is a suppressed and titular See of the Roman Catholic Church.

== History ==
Thysdrus, corresponding to the city of El Jem in present-day Tunisia, is an ancient episcopal seat of the Roman province of Byzacena. Thysdrus was the seat of a council celebrated in 417. The bishopric lasted until the Muslim conquest of the Maghreb, but was reborn in name at least in the early 20th century as a titular see. Today Thysdrus survives as a titular bishop's seat, the current titular bishop is Abelardo Alvarado Alcántara, former auxiliary bishop of Mexico City.

== Bishops ==
- Elpidio (mentioned in 393) took part in the Council of Cabarsussi, held in 393 by the Maximianists, a moderate sect of the Donatists, and he signed the deeds.
- Navigio (mentioned in 411) at the Carthage conference of 411, which saw together the Catholic and Donatist bishops of Roman Africa, the Catholic Navigio and Honorato a Donatist both attended.
- Honored (mentioned in 411) (Donatist bishop at the Council of Carthage)
- Venerio (mentioned in 641) intervened at the antimonotelite council of 641.
- Carlos Quintero Arce (1966 * 1968)
- Raymond Larose (1968 - 1984)
- Abelardo Alvarado Alcántara, (1985-current)
