= Antonio Ortega =

Antonio Ortega may refer to:

- Antonio Ortega Franco (1941–2022), Mexican prelate of the Roman Catholic Church
- Antonio Ortega Martínez (born 1954), Mexican politician from Aguascalientes
- Antonio Ortega (soldier) (1888–1939), Spanish Republican military leader and acting president of football club Real Madrid between 1937 and 1938
- Antonio Carlos Ortega (born 1971), Spanish Olympic handball player
