= Francisco Daniel Rivera Sánchez =

Mexican bishop (1955–2021)

Francisco Daniel Rivera Sánchez, MSpS (15 October 1955 – 18 January 2021) was a Mexican Catholic auxiliary bishop.

== Biography ==
Rivera Sánchez was born on 15 October 1955 in Guadalajara, Jalisco, and was ordained to the priesthood in 1988.

He served as titular bishop of Aradi and as auxiliary bishop of the Roman Catholic Archdiocese of Mexico City from 2020 until his death on 18 January 2021 from COVID-19 in Mexico City during the COVID-19 pandemic in Mexico.
