= Diocese of Azcapotzalco =

Latin Catholic jurisdiction in Mexico

Diocese of Azcapotzalco Dioecesis Azcapotzalcensis Diócesis de Azcapotzalco

Location
- Country: Mexico
- Ecclesiastical province: Province of Mexico
- Metropolitan: México

Statistics
- Area: 75 km^{2} (29 sq mi)
- Population: Total; Catholics: (as of 2023); 1,050,250; 819,145 (78.0%)
- Parishes: 70

Information
- Denomination: Catholic Church
- Sui iuris church: Latin Church
- Rite: Roman Rite
- Established: 28 September 2019; 6 years ago
- Cathedral: Cathedral of Sts. Philip and James
- Secular priests: 106 (59 diocesan, 47 religious orders)

Current leadership
- Pope: Leo XIV
- Bishop: Sede vacante
- Metropolitan Archbishop: Carlos Aguiar Retes
- Apostolic Administrator: José Antonio Fernández Hurtado

Website
- https://diocesisazcapotzalco.org/

The Diocese of Azcapotzalco (Latin: Dioecesis Azcapotzalcensis) is a Latin Church ecclesiastical territory or diocese of the Catholic Church in Mexico.

== History ==
It was erected on 28 September 2019 with its territory having been carved from the Archdiocese of Mexico. The diocese is a suffragan in the ecclesiastical province of the metropolitan Archdiocese of Mexico and covers 59 parishes with 850,000 Catholics.

== Ordinaries ==
- Adolfo Miguel Castaño Fonseca (28 Sep 2019 – 11 Feb 2026), appointed Bishop of Atlacomulco, Mexico
  - Apostolic Administrator José Antonio Fernández Hurtado (13 Apr 2026 – Present); Archbishop of Tlalnepantla
