= García Guerra =

Mexican politician

Most Reverend García Guerra
- Archbishop of Mexico
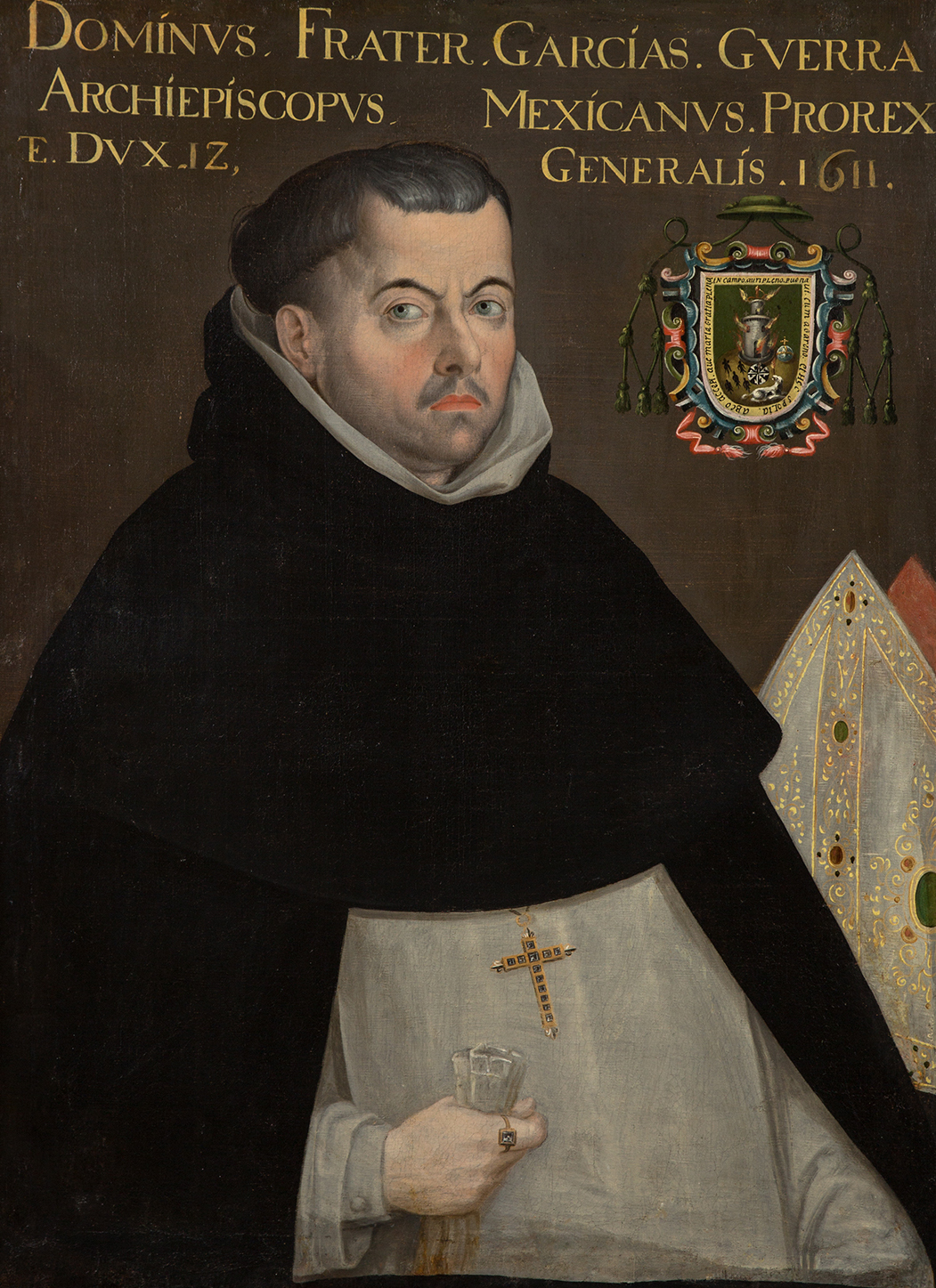
- Archbishop-Viceroy Fray García Guerra
- Church: Catholic Church
- Archdiocese: Archdiocese of Mexico
- Predecessor: García de Santa María Mendoza y Zúñiga
- Successor: Juan Pérez de la Serna

Personal details
- Born: 1547 Frómista, Palencia, Spain
- Died: February 22, 1612 (aged 64–65) Mexico City

Fray García Guerra (also Francisco García Guerra), OP (c. 1547 in Frómista, Palencia, Spain – February 22, 1612 in Mexico City), archbishop of Mexico and viceroy of New Spain. He held the former office from December 3, 1607, and the latter from June 19, 1611. He still occupied both offices at the time of his death in 1612.

== Biography ==
He became a Dominican in the Spanish monastery of San Pablo de Valladolid, where he served as prior and principal of the province. In 1607 Philip III named him archbishop of Mexico.

In 1611 a letter was received in Mexico City from Spain ordering the sitting viceroy, Luis de Velasco, marqués de Salinas to return to Spain to take charge of the Council of the Indies, and directed García Guerra to fill the position of viceroy until the appointment of another. The letter stipulated that Velasco was to remain in charge of the viceregal government until his actual departure from the colony. Velasco left the city on June 10, 1611, and Archbishop Guerra retired to Tacubaya to await the news of his sailing from Veracruz.

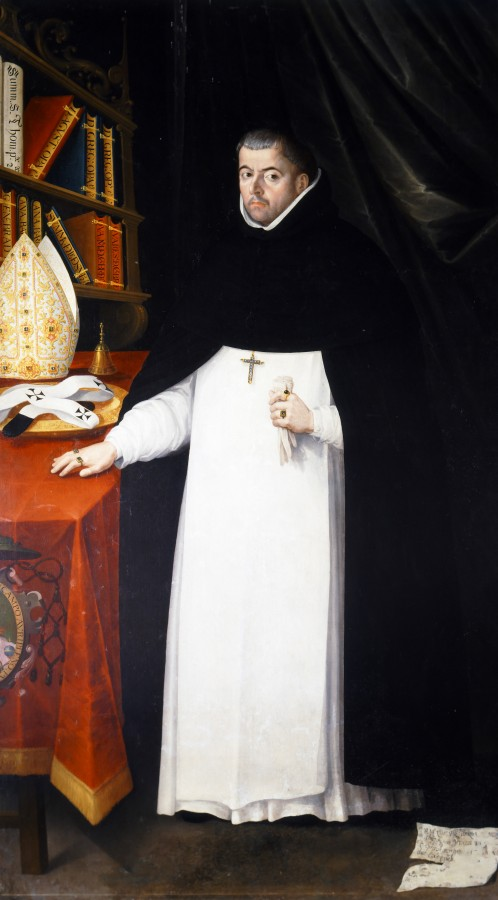
Archbishop-Viceroy Fray García Guerra, 1611–1612.

This news was received on June 18, 1611, and on the following day Guerra made his solemn entry into the capital. He was mounted on a fiery charger, beneath a canopy whose poles were carried by the councilors of the city, on foot and dressed in crimson velvet. Accompanying the archbishop were the members of the Audiencia and the tribunals, the royal officials, and the noblest and richest residents of the colony. The procession stopped first at the cathedral, where a solemn Te Deum was sung, and then passed to the viceregal palace, where Guerra officially took office.

As viceroy, he worked to find funds to improve the drainage system of Mexico City, the desagüe. He received a scientific report from the noted mathematician Ildefonso Arias that the project could not succeed because of the subterranean connection to the Río Acolhuacán.

He also attempted to restore ownership of land to Indians, where it had been usurped. He was not successful either, due to his short time in office and the strong opposition of the holders of encomiendas and latifundios, landed estates.

On August 26, 1611, an earthquake caused much damage in the capital, and some damage in the provinces. Many buildings were destroyed.

Not long after becoming viceroy, Guerra suffered an injury in the descent from his coach. He was operated on without success, and he died on February 22, 1612. He was interred with much ceremony in the cathedral of Mexico City. After his death, the Audiencia assumed the government, pending the arrival of his replacement. A few days later the Audiencia suppressed a supposed conspiracy of blacks to kill whites that was take place on Holy Thursday of 1612, hanging 29 men and four women.

While bishop, he was the principal consecrator of Alonso de Peralta, Archbishop of La Plata o Charcas (1609) and Jeronimo de Carcamo, Bishop of Trujillo (1611).

Religious titles
Preceded by García de Santa María Mendoza y Zúñiga	Archbishop of Mexico; 1607–1612	Succeeded by Juan Pérez de la Serna
Government offices
Preceded by Luis de Velasco, marqués de Salinas	Viceroy of New Spain; 1611–1612	Succeeded by Diego Fernández de Córdoba
