= Francisco María Aguilera González =

Mexican Bishop

- Titular bishop of Macriana in Mauretania
- Church: Roman Catholic Church
- See: Titular see of Macriana in Mauretania
- In office: 1969–1995
- Predecessor: John Michael Sherlock
- Successor: Current
- Previous post(s): Auxiliary bishop of Archdiocese of Mexico; Bishop

Orders
- Ordination: April 11, 1943

Personal details
- Born: April 27, 1918; Guanajuato, Mexico
- Died: August 5, 2010 (aged 92)

Francisco María Aguilera González (April 27, 1918 – August 5, 2010) was a Mexican Bishop of the Roman Catholic Church.

Aguilera González was born in Guanajuato and was ordained a priest April 11, 1943. He was appointed Auxiliary Bishop of the Archdiocese of Mexico on June 5, 1979, along with titular bishop of Macriana in Mauretania, and was ordained a bishop on August 15, 1979. Aguilera González retired from the Archdiocese of Mexico on June 12, 1996.

== See also ==
- Archdiocese of Mexico
