= Jesús Antonio Lerma Nolasco =

Mexican Catholic prelate (1945–2025)

Most Reverend Jesús Antonio Lerma Nolasco
- Bishop Emeritus of Iztapalapa
- Church: Roman Catholic Church
- Archdiocese: Mexico
- Diocese: Iztapalapa
- Appointed: 28 September 2019
- Retired: 14 August 2021
- Predecessor: New Creation
- Successor: Jorge Cuapio Bautista
- Previous post(s): Titular Bishop of Aulon and Auxiliary Bishop of Mexico (2009–2019)

Orders
- Ordination: 24 December 1971 (Priest) by Cardinal Adolfo Suárez Rivera
- Consecration: 10 July 2009 (Bishop) by Cardinal Norberto Rivera Carrera

Personal details
- Born: Jesús Antonio Lerma Nolasco; 4 July 1945; Xalisco, Nayarit, Mexico
- Died: 10 March 2025 (aged 79); Tepic, Nayarit, Mexico
- Motto: Dei populo servire
- Coat of arms

Styles of Jesús Antonio Lerma Nolasco
- Reference style: His Excellency; The Most Reverend
- Spoken style: Your Excellency
- Religious style: Bishop

Jesús Antonio Lerma Nolasco (4 July 1945 – 10 March 2025) was a Mexican Roman Catholic prelate.

== Biography ==
Lerma Nolasco after graduating studies at the Montezuma Theological Seminary in Montezuma, the United States, during 1963–1971, he was ordained priest on 24 December 1971 by Cardinal Adolfo Suárez Rivera at the Tepic Cathedral. After his ordination, he worked in the various positions in his native Diocese of Tepic since 1972 until 2009.

Pope Benedict XVI appointed him on 7 May 2009 as a titular bishop of Aulon and an Auxiliary Bishop of the Roman Catholic Archdiocese of Mexico. Archbishop of Mexico, Cardinal Norberto Rivera Carrera, consecrated him on 10 July of the same year in the Mexico City Metropolitan Cathedral.

On 28 September 2019, Lerma Nolasco was transferred as the first Diocesan Bishop of the newly created Diocese of Iztapalapa, where he served until his retirement on 14 August 2021, because of the age limit.

Lerma Nolasco died in Tepic on 10 March 2025, at the age of 79.

Catholic Church titles
New title	Bishop of Iztapalapa; 2019–2021	Succeeded by Jorge Cuapio Bautista
Preceded by Roger Paul Morin	Titular Bishop of Aulon; 2009–2019	Succeeded by Zdzisław Stanisław Błaszczyk
