= Diocese of Cancún-Chetumal =

Roman Catholic diocese in Mexico

Diocese of Cancún-Chetumal Diœcesis Cancunensis–Chetumaliensis Diócesis de Cancún-Chetumal
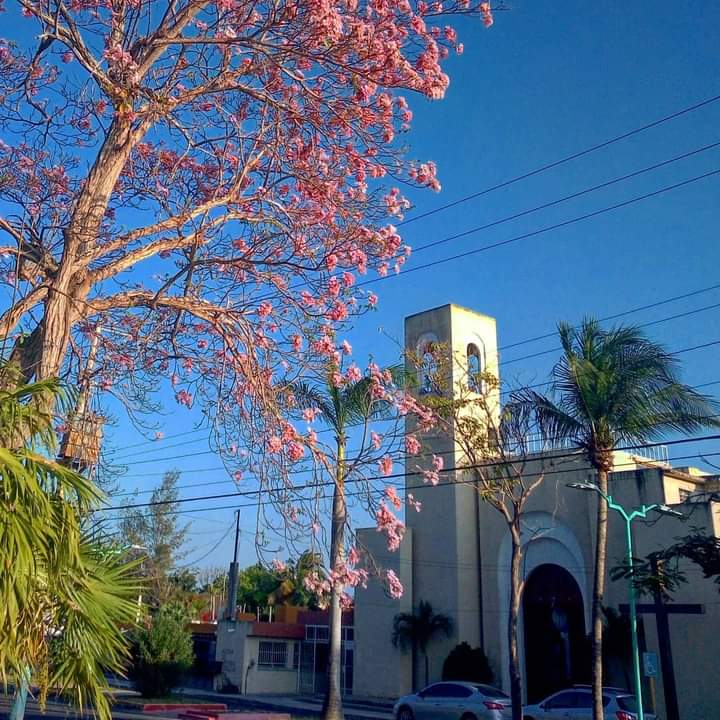
- Co-Cathedral of the Sacred Heart of Jesus in Chetumal

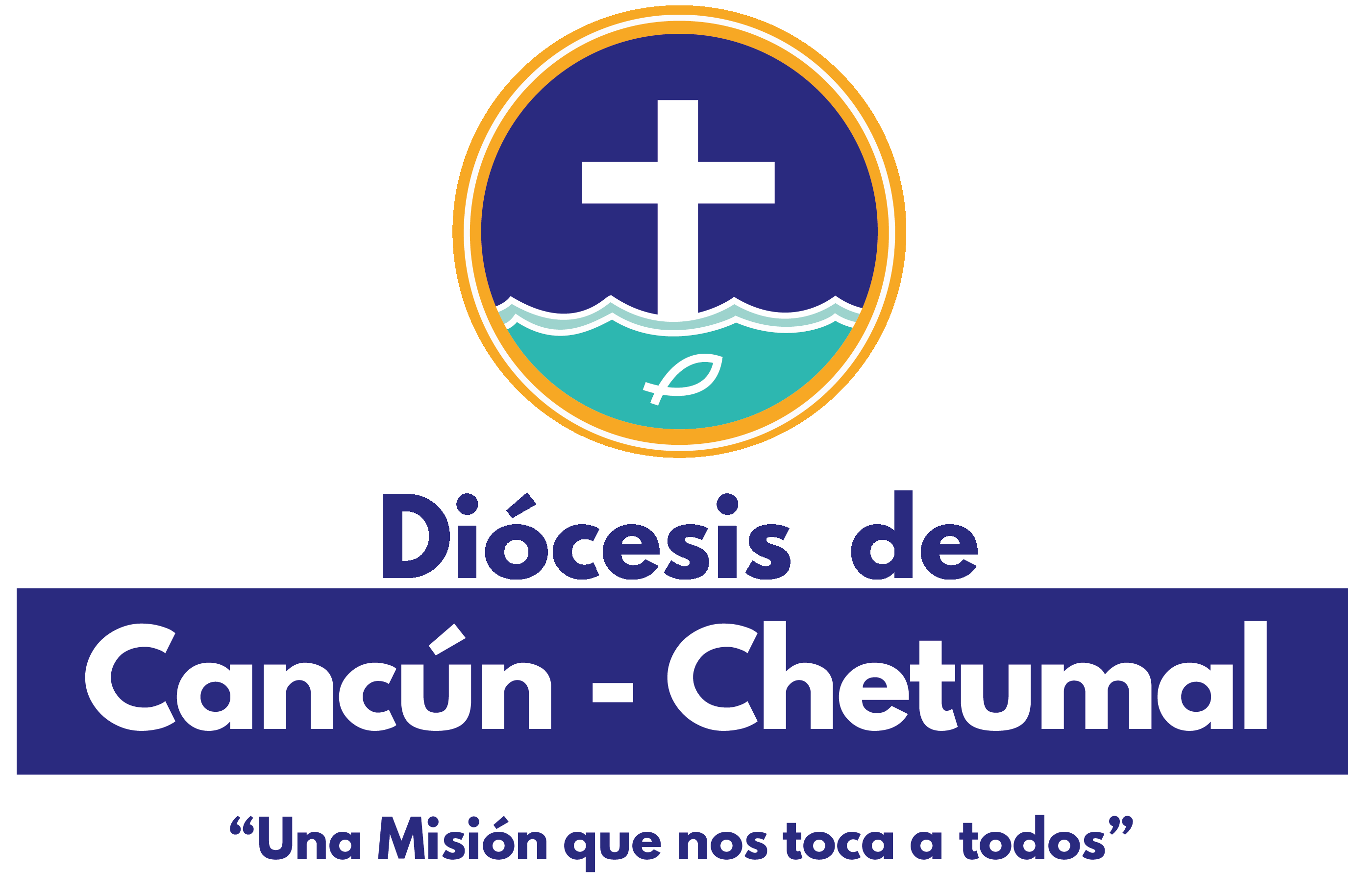
- Coat of arms

Location
- Country: Mexico
- Ecclesiastical province: Province of Yucatán
- Metropolitan: Cancún

Statistics
- Area: 19,638 sq mi (50,860 km^{2})
- Population: Total; Catholics: (as of 2023); 1,626,200; 1,040,214 (64.0%)
- Parishes: 74

Information
- Denomination: Roman Catholic
- Rite: Roman Rite
- Established: 23 May 1970 (55 years ago)
- Cathedral: Cathedral of the Most Holy Trinity
- Co-cathedral: Cathedral of the Sacred Heart of Jesus

Current leadership
- Pope: Leo XIV
- Bishop: Salvador González Morales
- Metropolitan Archbishop: Gustavo Rodriguez Vega

Map
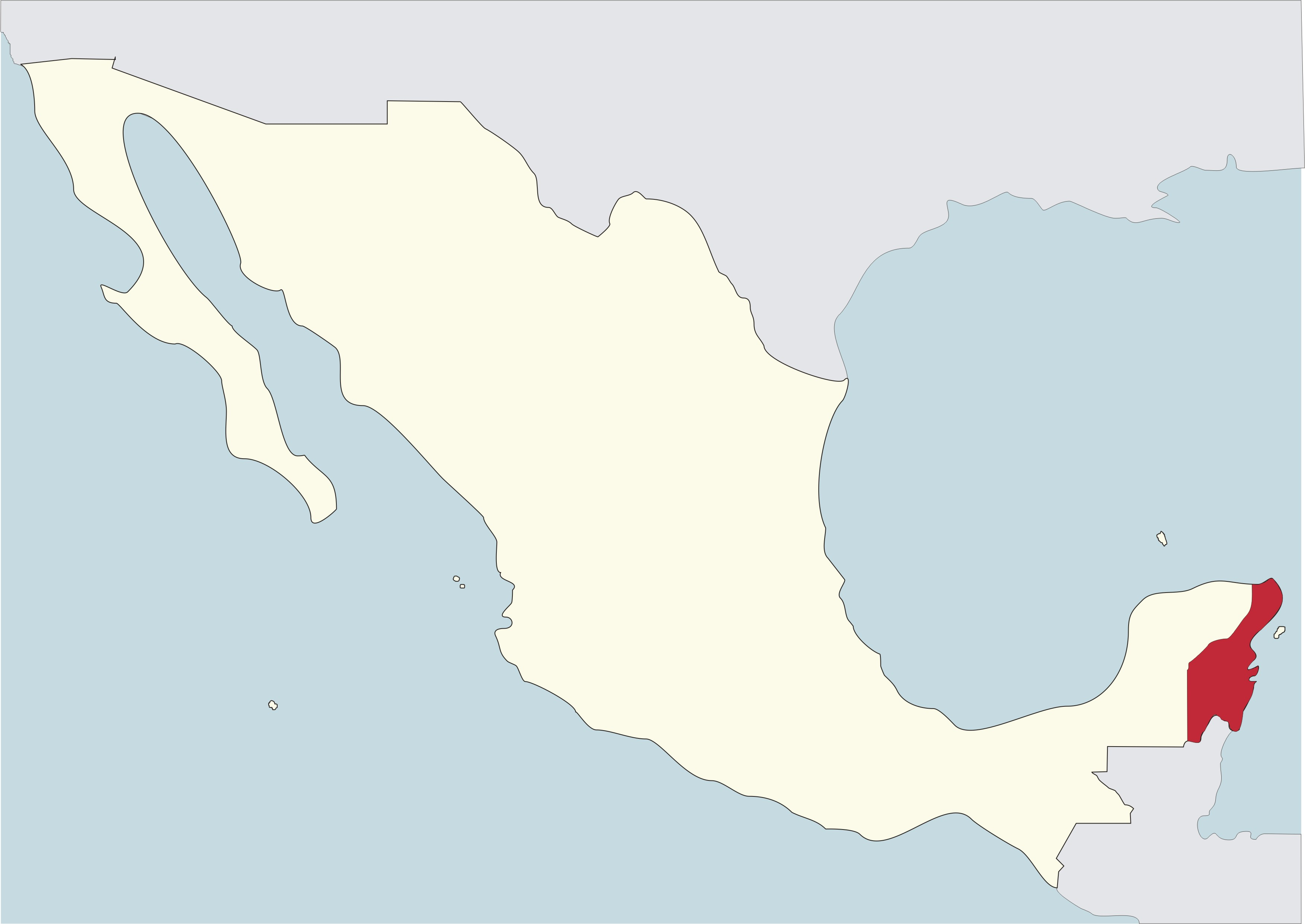

Website
- https://www.diocesiscancunchetumal.org/

The Roman Catholic Diocese of Cancún–Chetumal (Latin: Dioecesis Cancunensis–Chetumaliensis) is a suffragan of the Metropolitan Archdiocese of Yucatán. It was elevated from a Roman Catholic Territorial Prelature on 15 February 2020.

== History ==
=== Elevation to Diocese ===
Originally the Territorial Prelature of Chetumal, the diocese was erected on 23 May 1970 by Pope Paul VI. It was renamed the Territorial Prelature of Cancún–Chetumal on 20 December 1996, reflecting territorial expansion into Cancún. On 15 February 2020, the prelature was elevated to a diocese by Pope Francis. This elevation was received well by the Mexican bishops, represented by the CEM secretary Bishop Alfonso Miranda Guardiola.

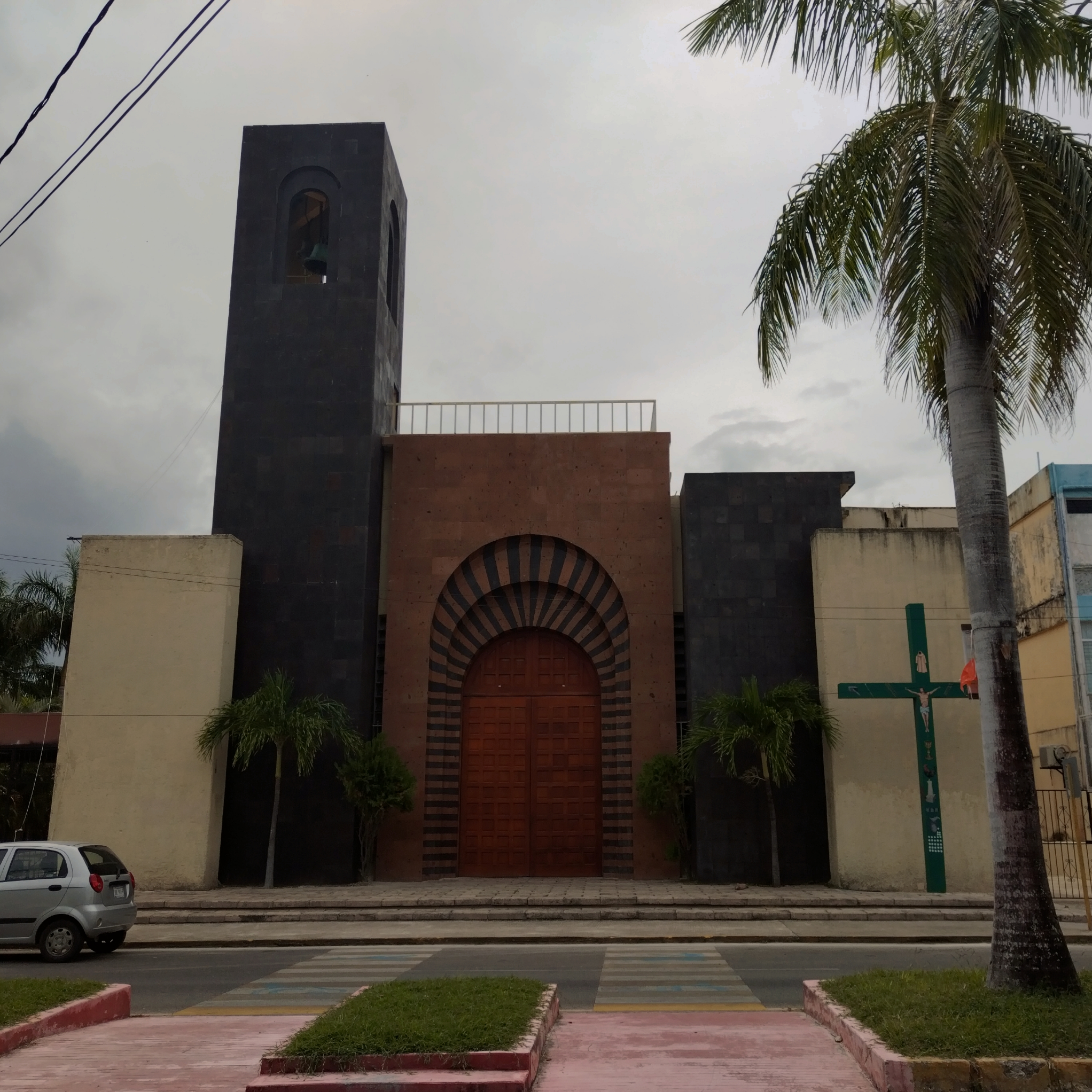
Catedral del Sagrado Corazón, Chetumal

The diocese has both a cathedral in Cancun and a co-cathedral in Chetumal. Its cathedral church is named Catedral de la Santa Cruz y la Santísima Trinidad (Cathedral of the Holy Cross and Most Holy Trinity) and its co-cathedral is Catedral del Sagrado Corazón (Cathedral of the Sacred Heart).

=== Catedral de la Santa Cruz y la Santísima Trinidad ===
The cathedral church in Cancún was under construction for over 20 years and was completed in 2025. Bishop Elizondo had invited Pope Francis to consecrate the finished church prior to the Pope's death in 2025. Its atrium is 25 meters tall, topped with a 12 step Mayan pyramid and cross. This combines indigenous symbolism with a reference to the 12 apostles. There is also a cenote baptistery chapel, recalling the first Mayans baptized in the region in 1518.

The complex around the cathedral also houses a community center offering medical, legal, psychological, and occupational services.

== Territory and culture ==
=== Territory ===
Currently, the diocese's territory is equivalent to the territory of Quintana Roo. This includes the islands of Cozumel, Isla Mujeres, Contoy, and Holbox to the north and west of the Yucatan Peninsula.

=== Culture ===
The diocese is multilingual and has a reputation for ministering to tourists, including 32 chapels on beaches and in resorts. As of 2025, Mass and confession are said in seven languages, including Spanish and Mayan.

=== Society of Saint Pius X ===
The Fraternal Society of Saint Pius X (SSPX) is active in the Diocese of Cancún-Chetumal. Bishop Elizondo publicly critiqued the group and discouraged Catholics from attending their services in 2024, following similar statements from other dioceses in Mexico, Honduras, and Panama.

== Bishops ==
The territory's first two prelates were members of the Legion of Christ (L.C.). In 2020, the territory was elevated to a diocese, so its bishop assumed the title of Ordinary rather than Territorial Prelate.

=== Apostolic Administrator ===
- Jorge Bernal Vargas, L.C. (1970–1974; consecrated Bishop in 1974)

=== Territorial Prelate ===
- Jorge Bernal Vargas, L.C. (1974–2004; of Chetumal until 1996)
- Pedro Pablo Elizondo Cárdenas, L.C. (2004–2020)

=== Ordinary ===
- Pedro Pablo Elizondo Cárdenas, L.C. (2020–2025)
- Salvador González Morales (2025–)

== External links and references ==
- GCatholic
- "Territorial Prelature of Cancún–Chetumal". Catholic-Hierarchy.
