= Jorge Bernal Vargas =

Mexican Catholic bishop (1929–2023)

His Excellency Jorge Bernal Vargas
- Prelate Emeritus of Cancún-Chetumal
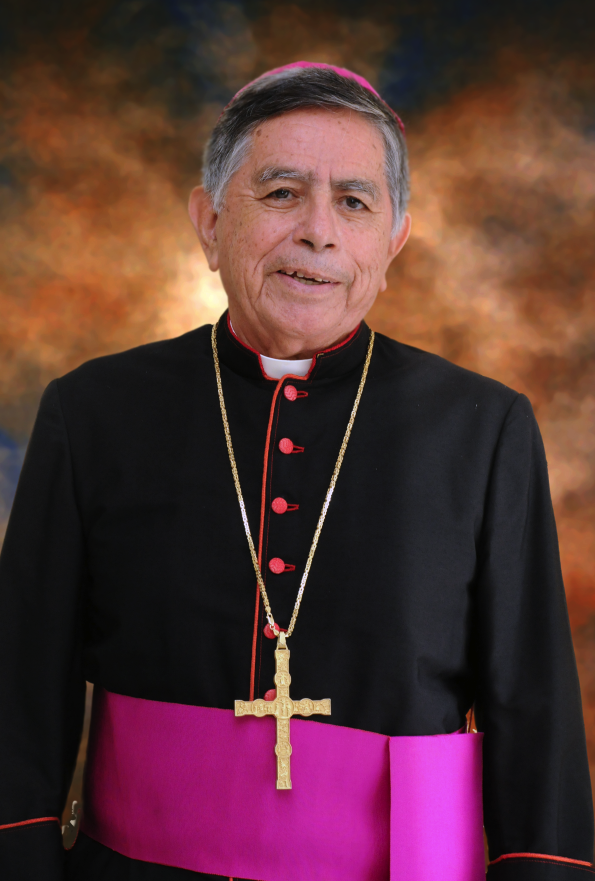
- Archdiocese: Yucatán
- Appointed: 7 December 1973
- Term ended: 26 October 2004
- Predecessor: Position created
- Successor: Pedro Pablo Elizondo Cárdenas
- Other post: Titular Bishop of Velefi (1973–1978)

Orders
- Ordination: 15 September 1957
- Consecration: 19 March 1974 by Mario Pio Gaspari

Personal details
- Born: 28 February 1929 San José Tepeyahualco, Tlaxcala, Mexico
- Died: 11 July 2023 (aged 94) Chetumal, Quintana Roo, Mexico

Jorge Bernal Vargas (28 February 1929 – 11 July 2023) was a Mexican Roman Catholic prelate. He was bishop of Cancún-Chetumal from 1974 to 2004.

Catholic Church titles
Preceded by Position created	Prelate of Cancún-Chetumal; 1973–2004	Succeeded by Pedro Pablo Elizondo Cárdenas
Preceded by João Batista Muniz	Titular Bishop of Velefi; 1973–1978	Succeeded by Vicente Macanan Navarra
