= Diocese of Iztapalapa =

Latin Catholic jurisdiction in Mexico

Diocese of Iztapalapa Dioecesis Iztapalapanus Diócesis de Iztapalapa
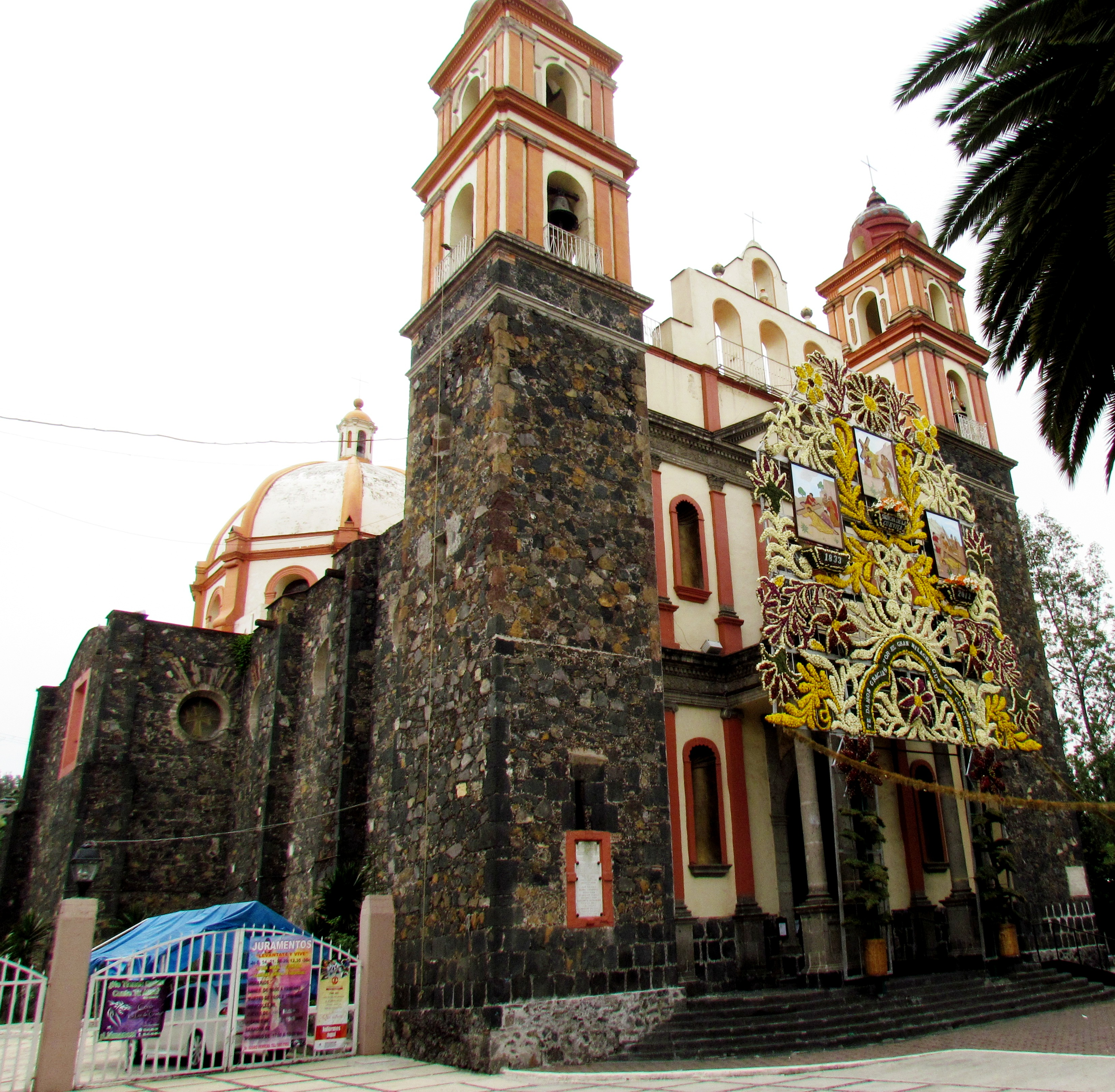

Location
- Country: Mexico
- Ecclesiastical province: Province of Mexico
- Metropolitan: México

Statistics
- Area: 117 km^{2} (45 sq mi)
- Population: Total; Catholics: (as of 2019); 1,827,868; 1,517,130 (83%)
- Parishes: 105

Information
- Denomination: Catholic Church
- Sui iuris church: Latin Church
- Rite: Roman Rite
- Established: 28 September 2019 (5 years ago)
- Cathedral: Cathedral Shrine of the Lord of the Holy Sepulchre

Current leadership
- Pope: Leo XIV
- Bishop: Jorge Cuapio Bautista
- Metropolitan Archbishop: Carlos Aguiar Retes

Website
- https://www.diocesisdeiztapalapa.org/

The Diocese of Iztapalapa (Latin: Dioecesis Iztapalapanus) is a Latin Church ecclesiastical territory or diocese of the Catholic Church in Mexico.

== History ==
It was erected on 28 September 2019 with its territory having been carved from the Archdiocese of Mexico. The diocese is a suffragan in the ecclesiastical province of the metropolitan Archdiocese of Mexico and covers a total of 105 parishes (75 parishes & 30 quasi-parishes) with 1,517,130 Catholics.

== Ordinaries ==
- Jesús Antonio Lerma Nolasco: (28 Sep 2019 - 14 Aug 2021)
- Jorge Cuapio Bautista: (14 Aug 2021 - Present)
