= Alfonso Fernández de Bonilla =

Most Reverend Alfonso Fernández de Bonilla
- Archbishop of Mexico
- Church: Catholic Church
- Diocese: Archdiocese of Mexico
- In office: 1593–1600
- Predecessor: Pedro Moya de Contreras
- Successor: García de Santa María Mendoza y Zúñiga

Orders
- Consecration: 1593 by Toribio Alfonso de Mogrovejo

Personal details
- Died: 1600

Alfonso Fernández de Bonilla (died 1600) was a Spanish Catholic prelate who served as the Archbishop of Mexico (1593–1600).

On May 22, 1592, Alfonso Fernández de Bonilla was appointed by Pope Clement VIII as Archbishop of Mexico. In 1593, he was consecrated bishop by Toribio Alfonso de Mogrovejo, Archbishop of Lima. He served as Archbishop of Mexico until his death in 1600.

Religious titles
Preceded by Pedro Moya de Contreras	Archbishop of Mexico; 1593–1600	Succeeded by García de Santa María Mendoza y Zúñiga
