= Diocese of Xochimilco =

Latin Catholic jurisdiction in Mexico

Diocese of Xochimilco Dioecesis Xochimilcensis Diócesis de Xochimilco
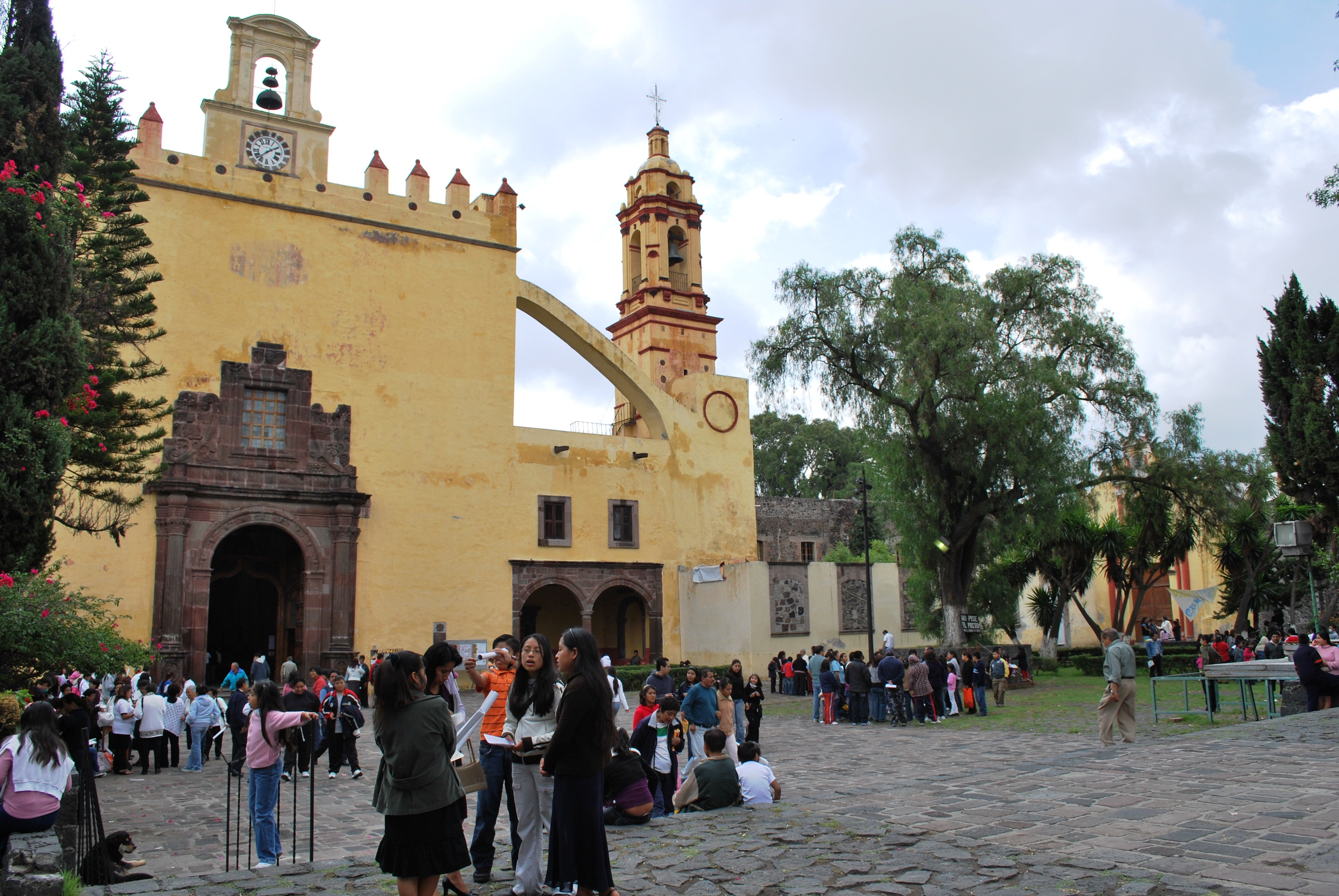

Location
- Country: Mexico
- Ecclesiastical province: Province of Mexico
- Metropolitan: México

Statistics
- Area: 433 km^{2} (167 sq mi)
- Population: Total; Catholics: (as of 2019); 769.250; 655,000 (85.1%)
- Parishes: 40

Information
- Denomination: Catholic Church
- Sui iuris church: Latin Church
- Rite: Roman Rite
- Established: 28 September 2019 (6 years ago)
- Cathedral: San Bernardino de Siena Church, Xochimilco

Current leadership
- Pope: Leo XIV
- Bishop: Juan María Huerta Muro, O.F.M.
- Metropolitan Archbishop: Carlos Aguiar Retes
- Bishops emeritus: Andrés Vargas Peña

Website
- https://www.diocesisxochimilco.com/

The Diocese of Xochimilco (Latin: Dioecesis Xochimilcensis) is a Latin Church ecclesiastical territory or diocese of the Catholic Church in Mexico.

== History ==
It was established on 28 September 2019 with its territory having been carved from the Archdiocese of Mexico. The diocese is a suffragan in the ecclesiastical province of the metropolitan Archdiocese of Mexico and covers 40 parishes with 655,000 Catholics.

== Ordinaries ==
- Andrés Vargas Peña (28 Sep 2019 – 11 Feb 2025), retired
- Juan María Huerta Muro, O.F.M. (11 Feb 2025 – Present)
