= Luis Manuel Pérez Raygoza =

Mexican Catholic bishop (born 1973)

Luis Manuel Pérez Raygoza (Note: In this Mexican name, the surname is Pérez and the second or maternal family name is Raygoza.) (born 21 August 1973) is a Mexican Roman Catholic bishop. He is titular bishop of Suava and auxiliary bishop of the Archdiocese of Mexico.

== Biography ==
He was born on 21 August 1973, in Mexico City. He is the oldest of four children born to Hermilo Pérez Trejo and Rosalina Raygoza Sánchez.

=== Education ===
He attended secondary school at the Colegio de Ciencias y Humanidades Plantel Sur in Coyoacán. After completing his education there, he entered the minor seminary and then the Seminario Conciliar de México in Tlalpan, He completed his studies at the archdiocesan Institute of Priestly Formation (now the Universidad Cátolica Lumen Gentium), and a degree in Spiritual Theology from the Pontifical Gregorian University in Rome in 2004.

=== Ordination ===
He was ordained as a deacon on 1 June 1999, and a priest on 13 May 2000. He was ordained a bishop on 19 March 2020, after being designated an auxiliary bishop of the Archdiocese of Mexico by Pope Francis on 25 January 2020.
