= Pedro Pablo Elizondo =

Mexican Roman Catholic bishop (1949–2026)

The Most Reverend Pedro Pablo Elizondo L.C.
- Bishop of Cancún-Chetumal
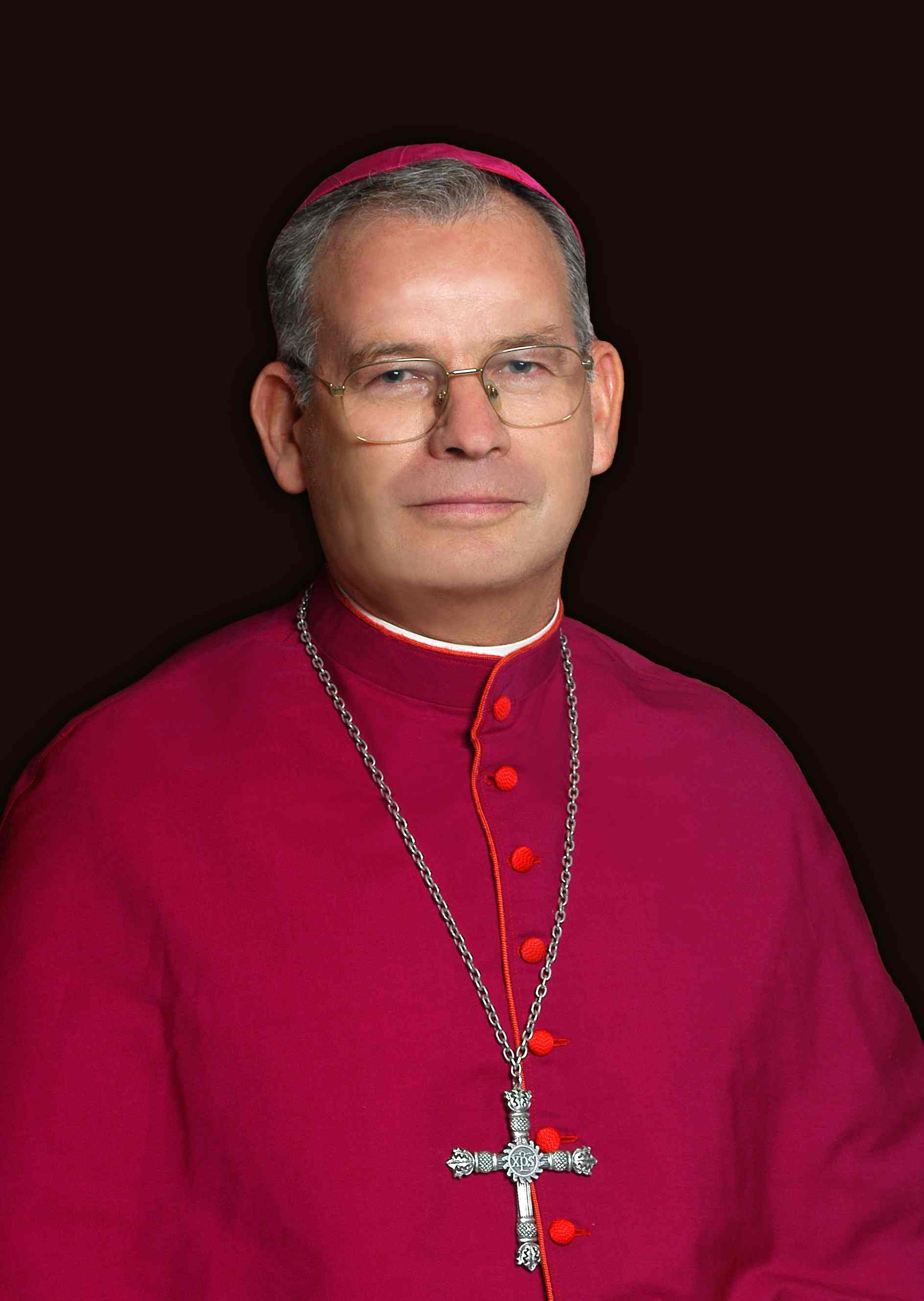
- Native name: Pedro Pablo Elizondo Cárdenas
- Archdiocese: Yucatán
- Diocese: Cancún-Chetumal
- Appointed: 22 November 2004
- Term ended: 6 December 2025
- Predecessor: Jorge Bernal Vargas
- Successor: Salvador González Morales

Orders
- Ordination: 24 December 1982
- Consecration: 22 November 2004 by Giuseppe Bertello, Emilio Carlos Berlie Belaunzarán, Jorge Bernal Vargas

Personal details
- Born: 4 September 1949 San José de Gracia, Michoacán, Mexico
- Died: 22 January 2026 (aged 76) Mérida, Yucatán, Mexico
- Motto: Si me amas apacienta ("If you love me, be my shepherd")
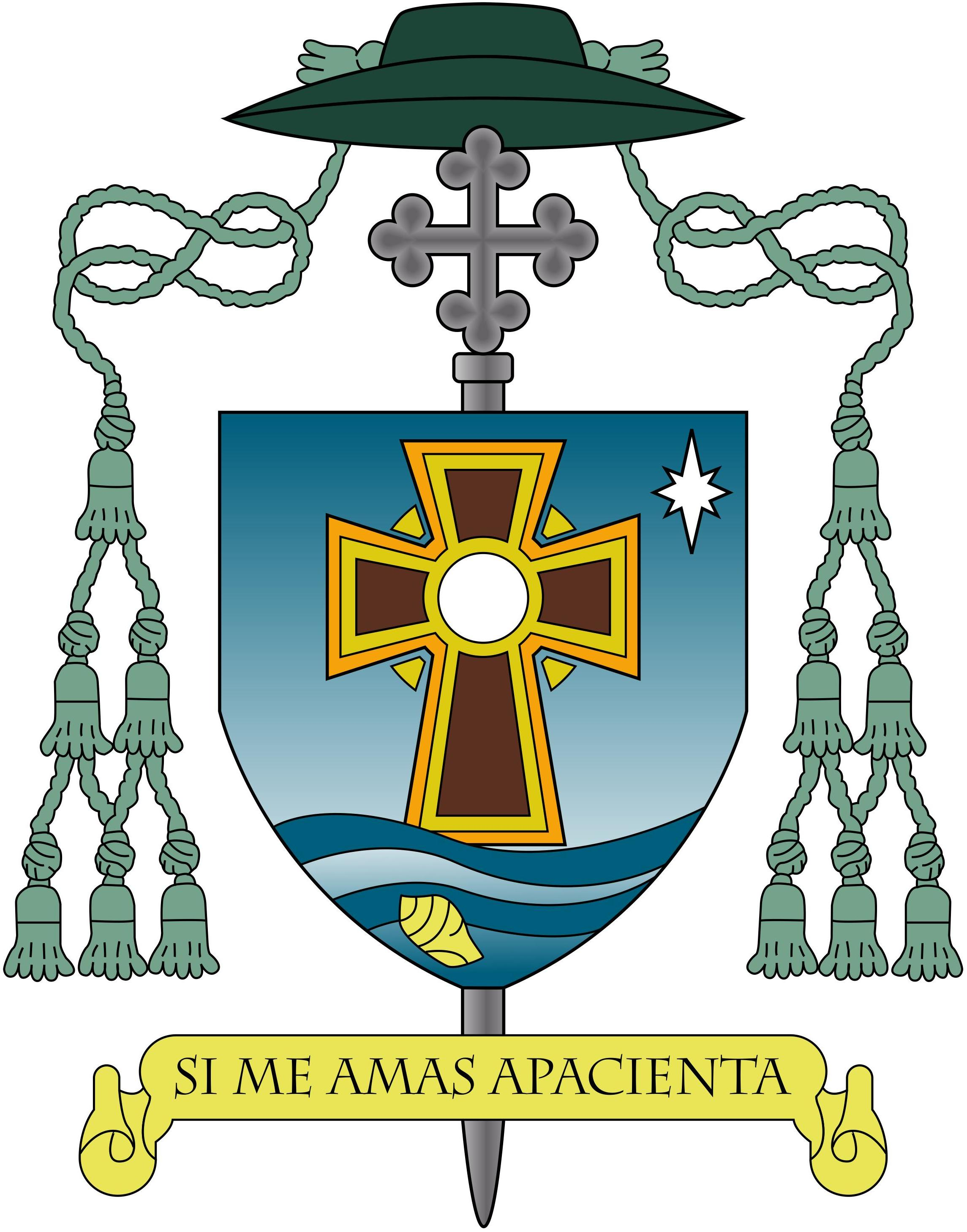
- Coat of arms

Styles of Pedro Pablo Elizondo
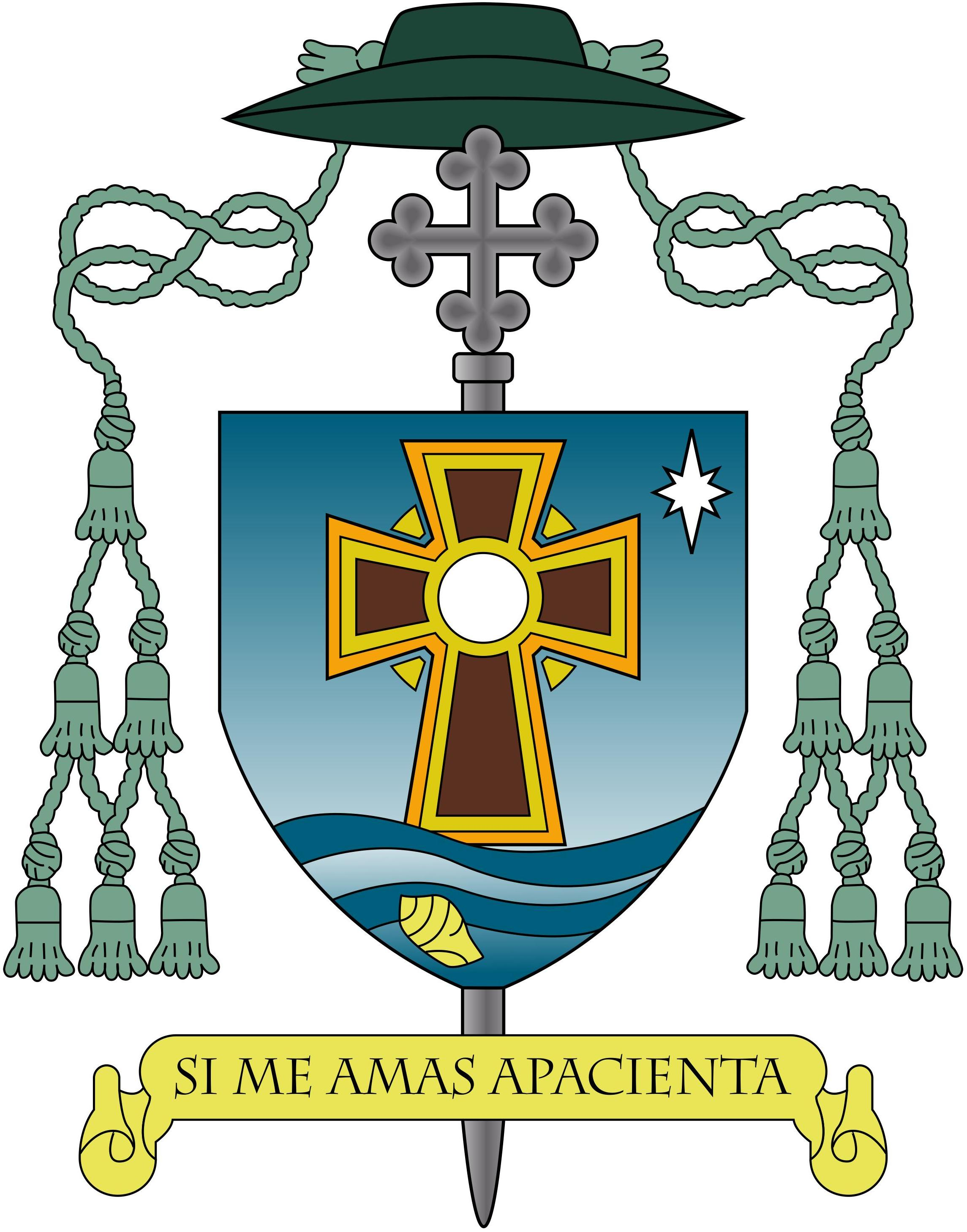
- Reference style: His Excellency; The Most Reverend
- Spoken style: Your Excellency
- Religious style: Bishop

Pedro Pablo Elizondo Cárdenas L.C. (4 September 1949 – 22 January 2026) was a Mexican Roman Catholic prelate. He was Bishop of Cancún-Chetumal from 2004 to 2025.

== Biography ==
Pedro Pablo Elizondo Cárdenas was born on 4 September 1949 in San José de Gracia, Michoacán, Mexico. He entered the Legionaries of Christ novitiate in 1966 and professed his perpetual vows in 1974. He completed his theological and philosophical studies in Rome, where he earned degrees at the Pontifical Gregorian University and the Pontifical University of Saint Thomas Aquinas. In 1982, he was ordained a priest in Rome.

In 2004, Elizondo was appointed as a territorial prelate of Cancún and Chetumal by Pope John Paul II and was consecrated as a bishop.

In 2020, Pope Francis elevated the prelature to the status of a diocese and Elizondo became its first diocesan bishop.

Elizondo died from a sudden heart attack in Mérida, on 22 January 2026, at the age of 76.

Catholic Church titles
| Preceded by Jorge Bernal Vargas | Bishop of Cancún-Chetumal; 2004–2025 | Succeeded by Salvador González Morales |
