= García de Santa María Mendoza y Zúñiga =

Archbishop of Mexico

Most Reverend García de Santa María Mendoza y Zúñiga
- Archbishop of Mexico
- Church: Catholic Church
- Diocese: Archdiocese of Mexico
- In office: 1600–1606
- Predecessor: Alfonso Fernández de Bonilla
- Successor: Francisco García Guerra

Orders
- Ordination: by Bernardo de Sandoval y Rojas
- Consecration: On August 15, 1601

Personal details
- Died: 1606

García de Santa María Mendoza y Zúñiga (died 1606) was a Spanish Catholic prelate who served as the Archbishop of Mexico (1600–1606).

== Biography ==
García de Santa María Mendoza y Zúñiga was ordained a priest in the Order of Saint Jerome. On December 6, 1600, he was appointed by Pope Clement VIII as Archbishop of Mexico. On August 15, 1601, he was consecrated bishop by Cardinal Bernardo de Sandoval y Rojas, Archbishop of Toledo. He served as Archbishop of Mexico until his death in 1606. While bishop, he was the principal consecrator of Diego Vázquez de Mercado, Bishop of Yucatán (1604).

Catholic Church titles
| Preceded by Alfonso Fernández de Bonilla | Archbishop of Mexico; 1600–1606 | Succeeded by Francisco García Guerra |
