= Rogelio Esquivel Medina =

Mexican bishop (1940–2023)

His Excellency Rogelio Esquivel Medina
- Auxiliary Bishop Emeritus of Mexico
- Appointed: 27 June 2001
- Term ended: 27 June 2008
- Other post: Titular Bishop of Garriana (2001–2023)

Orders
- Ordination: 13 September 1970
- Consecration: 15 August 2001 by Norberto Rivera Carrera

Personal details
- Born: 18 June 1940 Peribán de Ramos, Michoacán, Mexico
- Died: 20 June 2023 (aged 83)

Rogelio Esquivel Medina (18 June 1940 – 20 June 2023) was a Mexican Roman Catholic prelate who was auxiliary bishop of México from 2001 to 2008.

Catholic Church titles
Preceded by —	Auxiliary Bishop of Mexico; 2001–2008	Succeeded by —
Preceded by Vincenzo Savio	Titular Bishop of Garriana; 2001–2023	Succeeded by Edmar José da Silva
