= Royal Convent of Jesús María and Our Lady of Mercy =

- Convento Real de Jesús María y Nuestra Señora de la Merced
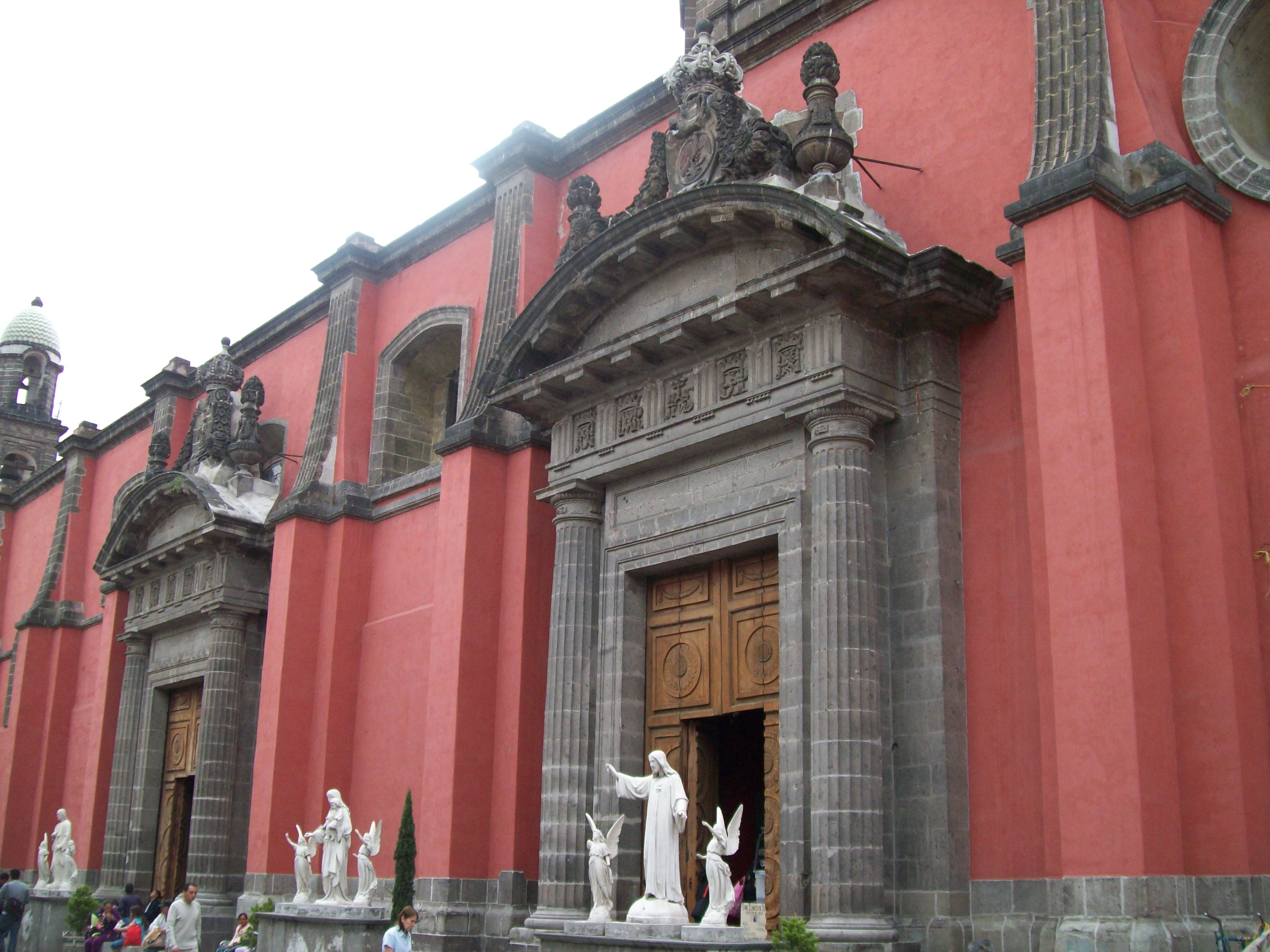
- The church's exterior, 2012

- Location within Mexico
- 19.4320°N 99.1282°W
- Location: Mexico City
- Country: Mexico

History
- Founded: 1580

The Royal Convent of Jesús María and Our Lady of Mercy (Spanish: Convento Real de Jesús María y Nuestra Señora de la Merced) is a church in the historic center of Mexico City, Mexico. Originally a convent for orphaned and undowried girls, Jesús María was the third Conceptionist convent in Mexico City when it was formed in 1580. Its founders were granted financial support from Philip II of Spain, who planned to make Jesús María a leading convent in New Spain.

== History ==
=== Background ===
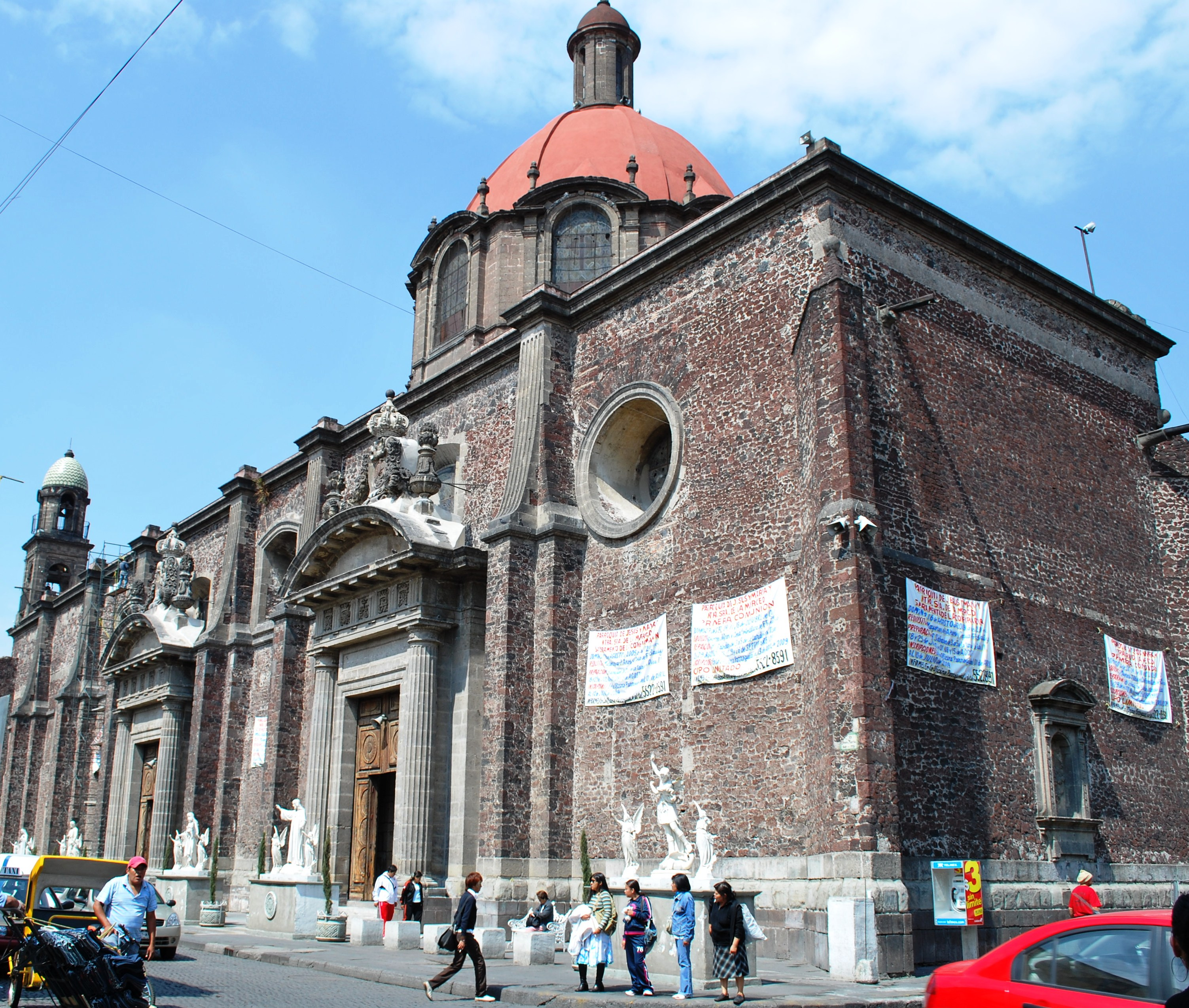
Exterior, 2009

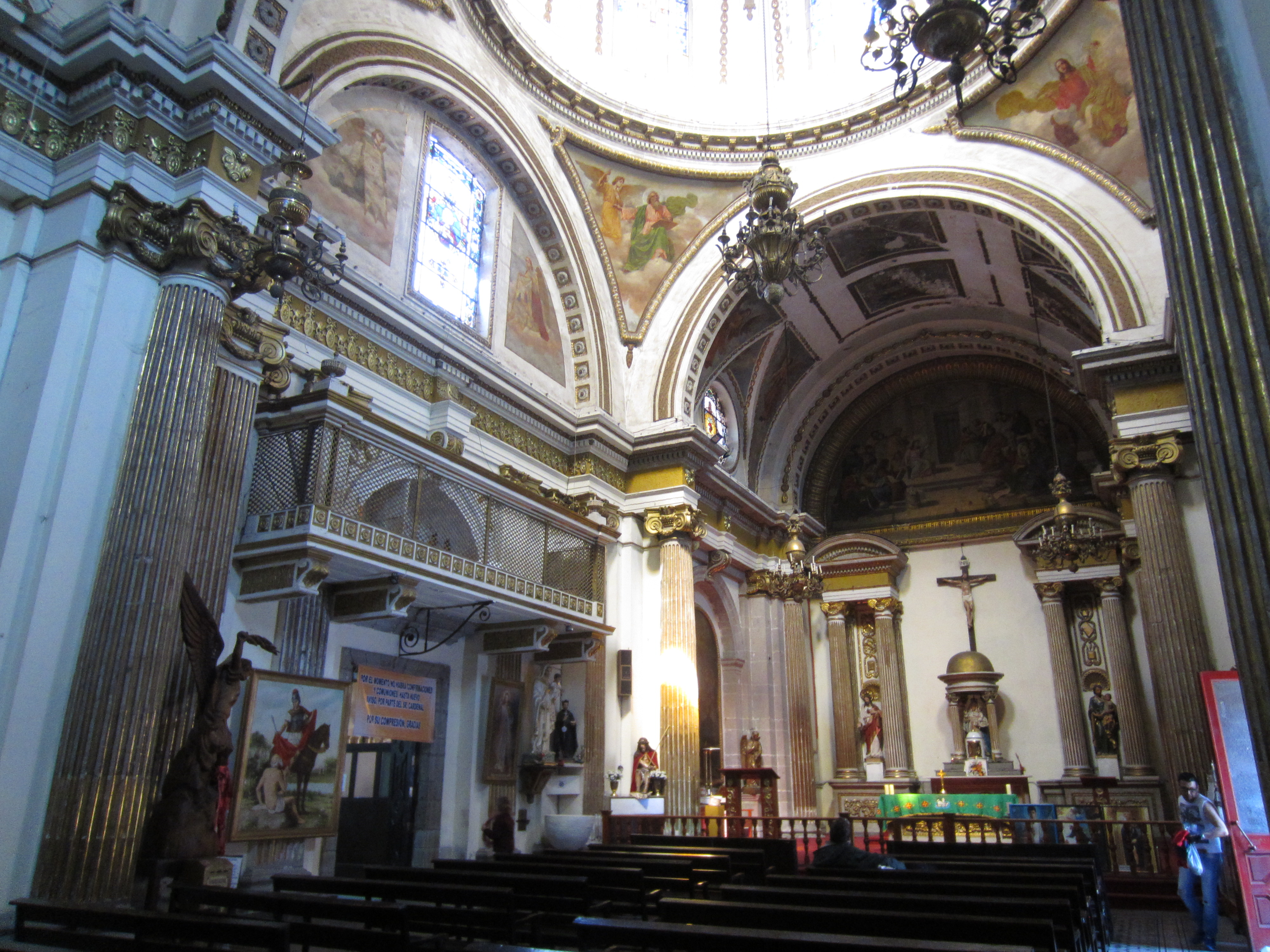
Interior, 2018

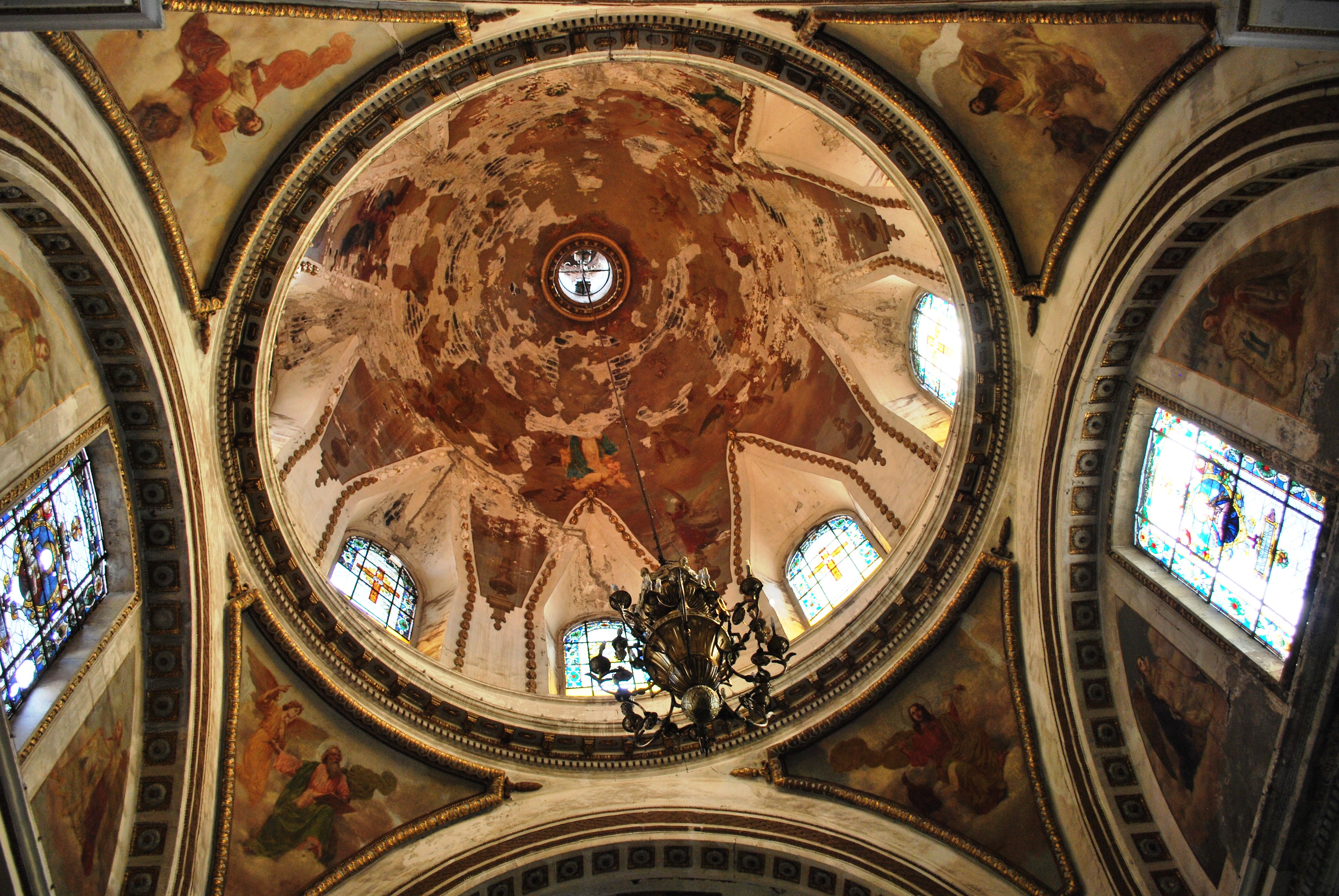
The church's cupola in 2009

During the 16th century, Archbishop Pedro Moya de Contreras was concerned with the growing presence of orphaned girls in Mexico City. Most of these girls were children or grandchildren of Spanish conquistadores or early New Spain settlers. Since their parents did not have enough dowries to marry them, these girls remained single and were not admitted into suitable convents, as dowries were often necessary to financially support convents.

To alleviate the conditions of undowried women, layperson Pedro Tomás de Denia founded the convent with the help of Gregorio Pesquera. Pesquera initially contributed with a significant financial donation; de Denia sought more money by creating a fundraiser in Mexico's northern mines. Both eventually garnered the interest of Martín Enríquez de Almanza and Moya de Contreras to help contribute to the project. The archbishop asked citizens to contribute to the project. Enough money was eventually raised, and Denia bought the building from an agency managed by oidor Pedro Farfán, on 11 April 1578. Moya de Contreras then transferred ten nuns from another convent to help run Jesús María. The convent opened its doors in 1580 with a class of fifteen girls. It was initially a convent for Conceptionist sisters. Jesús María thus became the third Conceptionist convent in Mexico City.

=== Royal funding ===
Although Denia and the other contributors had raised enough money to purchase the building, they did not have enough for maintenance. Both Denia and Moya de Contreras carried out their own measures to ensure the convent was endowed. After 1580, Denia returned to Spain to seek support from Philip II of Spain. He also sought support from the Vatican to help get the convent special spiritual privileges in order to make it a popular pilgrimage attraction and increase donations. Denia had a hearing with Philip II, and gave him a letter from Moya de Conteras specifying the requirements of the convent. Philip II agreed and allotted 60,000 ducados in a twenty-year payment plan. He also issued an order on 4 February 1583, in which he declared himself the convent's chief patron. He ordered that Moya de Contreras should have authority on all matters relating to the convent. On Denia's urging, Philip II further ordered that the location of the convent should not change. Through his contact with the Vatican, Philip II asked the Pope to make Jesús María the largest indulgenced chapel in New Spain.

According to Mexican historian Carlos de Sigüenza y Góngora, Philip II's eagerness to financially support the convent was driven by his interest in caring for the life of his illegitimate daughter Micaela de los Ángeles. In the letter handed by Denia to Philip II, Moya de Contreras detailed how he was caring for Micaela at the convent. Micaela was also Moya de Contreras' niece, having been born from Philip II and Moya de Contreras' sister out of wedlock. Micaela arrived in New Spain along with Moya de Contreras when she was two years old, after Philip II asked him to do so in order to not cause controversy in Spain. She was initially in La Concepción convent under the care of Mother Isabel Bautista. When Jesús María was formed, Bautista became the first abbess of the convent. Micaela was twelve years old when the convent was formed.

== Constructions and repurpose ==
The building's construction expansions began on 15 March 1597 under the reign of Gaspar de Zúñiga, 5th Count of Monterrey. According to Sigüenza y Góngora, the cost of the construction totaled MXN$109,745. On 16 February 1621, it was repurposed into a temple by Diego Fernández de Córdoba, 1st Marquess of Guadalcázar. In 1892, Jesús María experienced building deterioration issues and was reconstructed with a neoclassical architecture. On 1 April 1933, via a government decree, religious ceremonies halted and the temple was closed. The former temple now serves as a church in the historic center of Mexico City.

== Bibliography ==
- Salazar Simarro, Nuria María (1986). El Convento de Jesús María de la Ciudad de México: historia artística 1577–1860 (in Spanish). Universidad Iberoamericana. OCLC 52636784.
- Poole, Stafford (2012). Pedro Moya de Contreras: Catholic Reform and Royal Power in New Spain, 1571–1591 (Second ed.). University of Oklahoma Press. ISBN 978-0806186191. OCLC 1043542413.
- Lavrin, Asunción (2008). Brides of Christ: Conventual Life in Colonial Mexico. Stanford University Press. ISBN 978-0804752831. OCLC 1026348293.
- Argueta, Jermán (2005). Crónicas y leyendas mexicanas (in Spanish). LD Books. ISBN 9707321032. OCLC 1010994616.
- Owens, Sarah E.; Mangan, Jane E. (2012). Women of the Iberian Atlantic: Poems. Louisiana State University Press. ISBN 978-0807147726. OCLC 795756935.
- Alonso Gutierrez, Jose Felix; Ávila Flores, Silvia; Alonso Gutiérrez del Olmo, José Félix; Villalbazo Reyes, José (1989). Guía del fondo: Convento de Jesús María (in Spanish). Secretariat of Health. OCLC 191748899.
