= Próspero Alarcón y Sánchez de la Barquera =

Mexican prelate

- Archbishop of Mexico
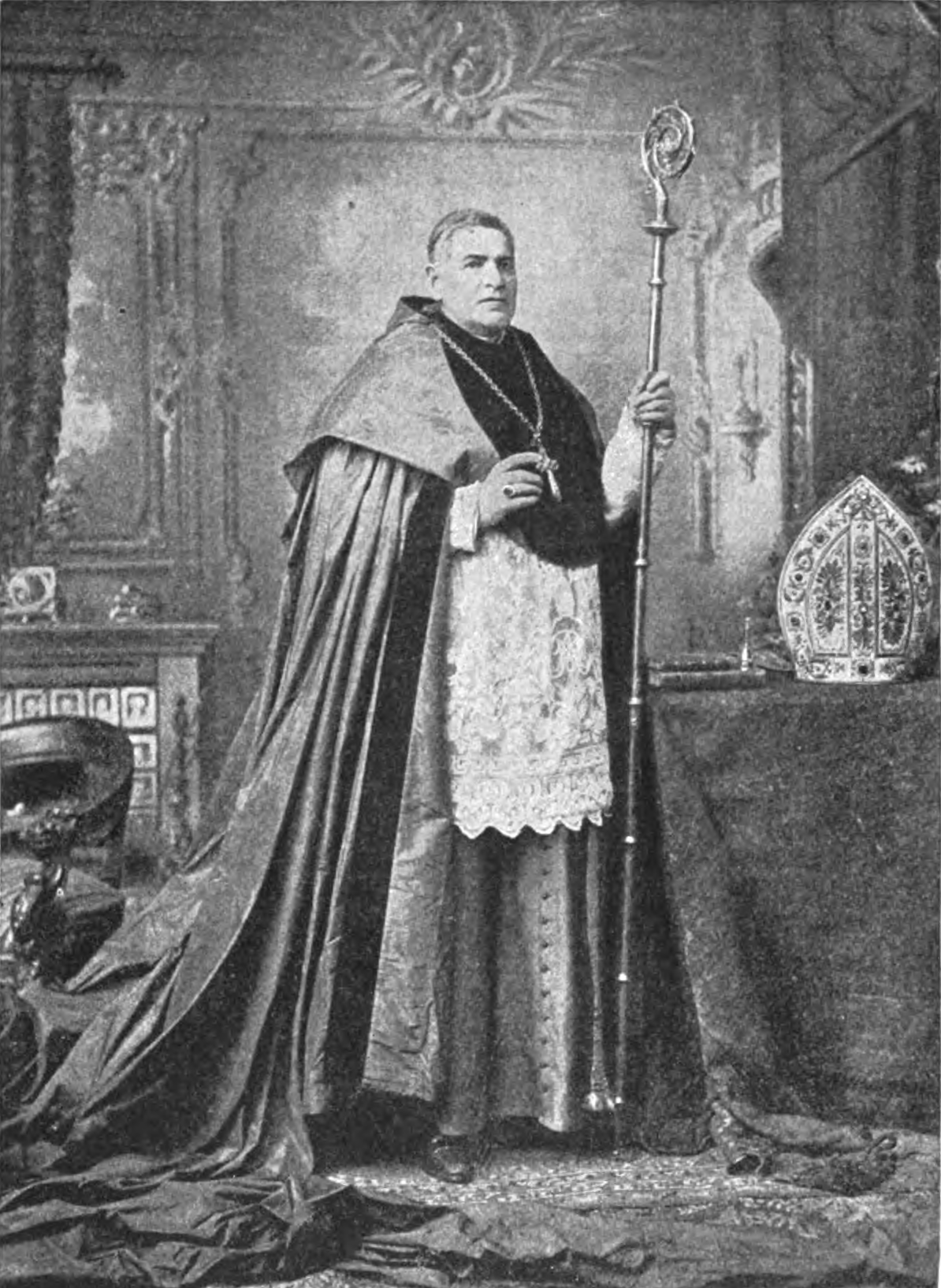
- Church: Catholic Church
- Archdiocese: Archdiocese of Mexico
- In office: 17 December 1891 – March 1908
- Predecessor: Pelagio Antonio de Labastida y Dávalos
- Successor: José Mora y del Río

Orders
- Ordination: 3 March 1855
- Consecration: 7 February 1892 by Ignacio Montes de Oca y Obregón

Personal details
- Born: 1827 Lerma, State of Mexico, United Mexican States
- Died: March 1908 (aged 80–81)

Archbishop Próspero María Alarcón y Sánchez de la Barquera (1827–1908) was a Mexican prelate of the Catholic Church. As bishop of Mexico City, he was a leader of the Mexican Church and was inspired by Pope Leo XIII's Rerum Novarum. He viewed the entrance of the Knights of Columbus into Mexico as evidence of the revival of lay Catholicism in Mexico. Alarcon was a native of Mexico and was delegated to Pontifically crown the image of Our Lady of Guadalupe in 1895.
