= Antonio Ortega Franco =

Mexican Roman Catholic prelate (1941–2022)

Antonio Ortega Franco (Note: In this Mexican name, the surname is Ortega and the second or maternal family name is Franco.) (22 December 1941 – 1 February 2022) was a Mexican prelate of the Roman Catholic Church.

Ortega Franco was born in Empalme Escobedo, Guanajuato, and was ordained to the priesthood in 1968. He served as titular bishop of Lete and as auxiliary bishop of the Roman Catholic Archdiocese of Mexico City from 2004 to his retirement in 2019. He died on 1 February 2022, at the age of 80.
