= Royal and Pontifical University of Mexico =

Historic university in Mexico City (1551–1865)

- Real y Pontificia Universidad de México
- Coat of arms of the Royal and Pontifical University of Mexico
- Motto: Patriae scientiae que amor salus populi est
- Motto in English: Love of the homeland and of knowledge is the health of the people
- Active: 21 September 1551–1865
- Affiliations: Roman Catholic
- Location: Mexico City, New Spain
- Campus: Urban

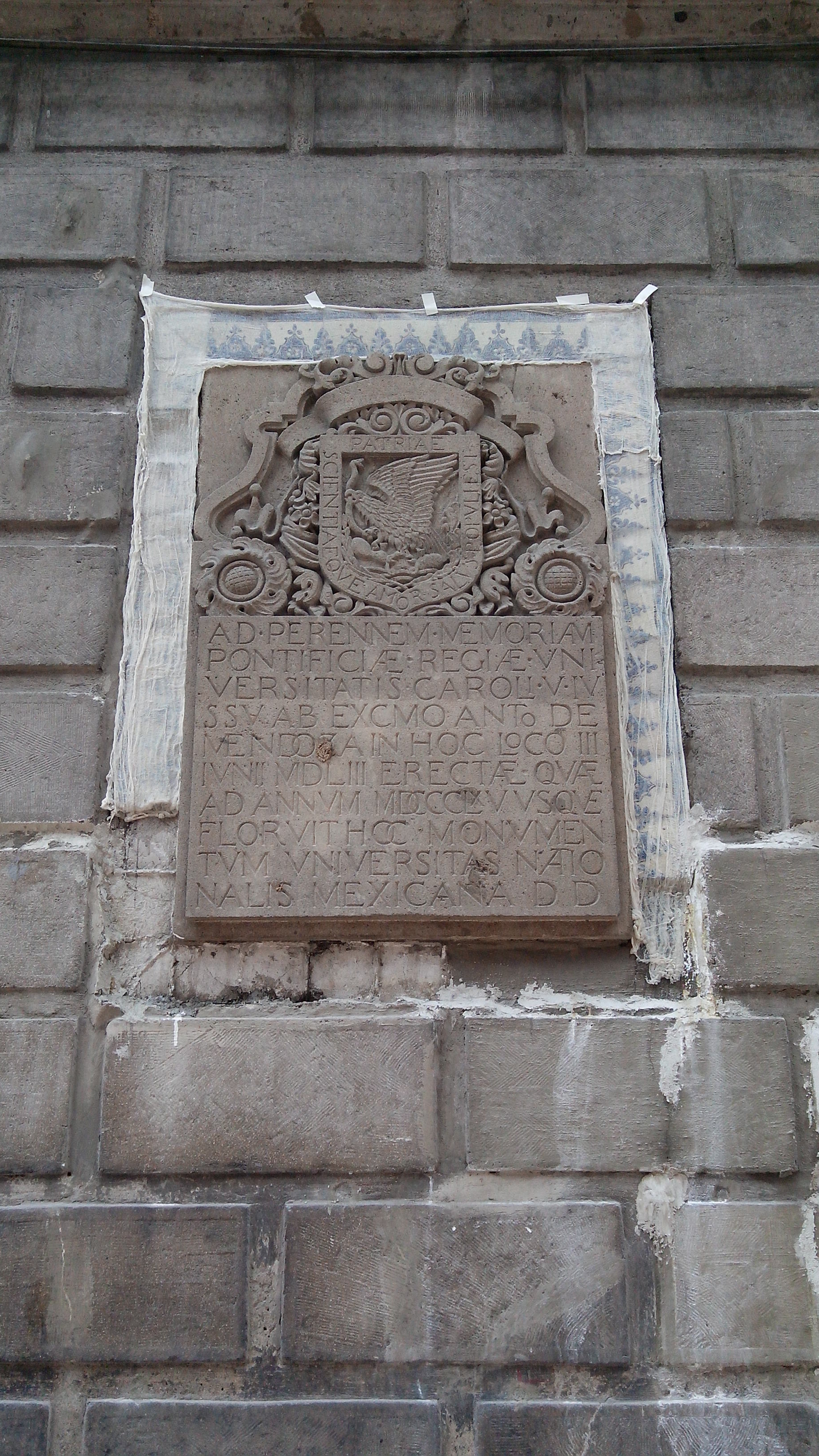
Shield in the present-day Palacio de la Autonomía

The Royal and Pontifical University of Mexico (Spanish: Real y Pontificia Universidad de México) was a university founded on 21 September 1551 by Royal Decree signed by Charles I of Spain, in Valladolid, Spain. It is generally considered one of the first universities founded in North America and second in the Americas (preceded by the National University of San Marcos in Lima, Peru, chartered on May 12 of the same year, and the Universidad Michoacana de San Nicolás de Hidalgo, formerly known as the Royal College of Saint Nicholas, established in 1540. After the Mexican War of Independence it was renamed the University of Mexico.

When Mexican liberals were in power at intervals in the nineteenth century, it was closed, since liberals sought to put education in the hands of the state rather than the Roman Catholic Church. Its first closure was in 1833, when Valentín Gómez Farías implemented liberal policies. When Antonio López de Santa Anna returned to power, the university was reopened. It was finally abolished in 1865 during the Second Mexican Empire by Maximilian I of Mexico. Scattered institutions, including secularized successors of its faculties of law and medicine, other secular colleges founded by liberals on the model of the French grandes ecoles, and religious establishments outside Mexico City, continued without interruption.

During the regime of Porfirio Díaz, Justo Sierra merged and expanded Mexico City's decentralized colleges of higher education, founding the National Autonomous University of Mexico (UNAM). UNAM is a public university founded in 1910 and claims to be the institutional heir of the earlier original University of Mexico, but under state rather than church control. Today, the Pontifical University of Mexico is the only pontifical university which exists in Mexico, established by the Holy See.

== Organization ==
The university was organized by five faculties: Theology, Canon Law, Medicine, and Arts. The principal subjects or chairs (in Spanish, cátedras) were Prima and Vísperas, due to the initial class being in the morning and the second in the evening. The university granted different degrees such as bachiller, licenciado, maestro and doctor, which translate to bachelor, graduate, master and doctor respectively.

== Notable alumni ==
- Bartolomé de Alva, Roman Catholic secular clergyman and Nahuatl translator.
- Joseph A. Lopez (1779–1841), priest and president of Georgetown University
- Agustín Dávila Padilla (1562–1604), chronicler of the Dominican Order and its missions in America up to the end of the 16th century.

== Notable faculty ==
- Juan José Eguiara y Eguren (? - 1763), Roman Catholic bishop and scholar who served as its rector.
- Francisco Cervantes de Salazar (1514? – 1575), a distinguished writer who served twice as rector during its early years.
- Alonso Gutiérrez (1507–1584), Augustinian philosopher, historian, and intellectual figure.
- Don Carlos de Sigüenza y Góngora (1645–1700), cartographer, historian and philosopher of the late 17th century.

== See also ==
- List of colonial universities in Latin America
- UNAM
- Pontifical University of Mexico
