= Abelardo Alvarado Alcántara =

Mexican Roman Catholic bishop (1933–2021)

Personal details
- Born: June 8, 1933
- Died: July 3, 2021 (aged 88)
- Occupation: Prelate

Abelardo Alvarado Alcántara (June 8, 1933 – July 3, 2021) was a Mexican Roman Catholic prelate who served as the auxiliary bishop of the Roman Catholic Archdiocese of Mexico City from 1985 until 2008. He was also the Secretary General of the Episcopal Conference of Mexico (CEM) from 1997 to 2004.

Mexico City Archbishop Norberto Rivera Carrera appointed Alvarado as Chaplain of the Mexican Armed Forces, which is based at the Military Chaplaincy, adjacent to the Hospital Central Militar Mexico. Alvarado also served as the president of the editorial board of the Nuevo Criterio, the official newspaper of the Archdiocese of Mexico City, from 1993 to 1998.

Bishop emeritus Abelardo Alvarado Alcántara died on July 3, 2021, at the age of 87. His funeral mass was held at the Mexico City Metropolitan Cathedral.
