= Universidad Pontificia de México =

Coordinates: 19.2881°N 99.1692°W

Pontifical University of Mexico
- Universidad Pontificia de México
- Motto: Alma Mexicanensis Universitas Manu Regia Condita
- Type: Private university Theological Seminary; Law School
- Established: 21 September 1551 (Charles I, King of Spain); 29 June 1982 (re-established, Pope John Paul II)
- Affiliations: Roman Catholic
- Chancellor: Carlos Aguiar Retes
- Rector: Próspero Alfredo Vargas
- Location: Mexico City, Mexico
- Campus: Urban
- Website: pontificia.edu.mx

The Universidad Pontificia de México (UPM, Pontifical University of Mexico) is a private Catholic university in Mexico City. Founded by the Roman Catholic Episcopal Conference in Mexico in 1982, it considers itself to be the successor to the Royal and Pontifical University of Mexico, which was founded in 1551 and closed in 1865. Another pontifical university was established in 1895 under Archbishop Próspero Alarcón y Sánchez de la Barquera, which closed in the aftermath of the Cristero War in 1932. Archbishop Miguel Darío Miranda sought to revive the original university. In 1967, he established the Higher Institute of Ecclesiastical Studies in order to lay the groundwork for a reestablished pontifical university, which was canonically erected in 1982. It is the only existing pontifical university in Mexico.

The Pontifical University is made up of three ecclesiastical faculties: theology, philosophy, and canon law. It also has programs for civil law, and some masters programs. Many of its alumni are Catholic clergymen. In 2025, it had almost 400 students.

In 2018, a spiral arrangement of ten skeletons dating to the preclassic period was discovered on the university's campus.

== See also ==
- Pontifical university
- Royal and Pontifical University of Mexico
