= Conciliar Seminary of Mexico =

Seminary in Mexico City

- Seminario Conciliar de México
- Established: 1585
- Location: Mexico City

The Conciliar Seminary of Mexico is a seminary in Mexico City.

== History ==
=== Foundation ===
The Third Mexican Provincial Council of 1585 discussed the foundation of a conciliar seminary for Mexico. In 1592 Philip II of Spain issued a royal decree which ordered seminaries to be founded in all of New Spain's vice-regalities, but the foundation of a conciliar one proved slow. It took until 1 October 1689, when viceroy Conde de Galve and Francisco de Aguiar, Archbishop of Mexico agreed by decree to found a conciliar seminary and on 18 October the same year the archbishop blessed the start of grammar and morality classes.

The seminary matured between the early 18th and late 19th centuries. It took a major part in the enacting of Mexico's reform laws in 1860 and the following year it was closed and its property next to the Metropolitan Cathedral was expropriated. It then re-opened and moved into the former convent of the Camilo Fathers.
