= José Antonio Pérez Sánchez =

Mexican Catholic priest (1947–2020)

José Antonio Pérez Sánchez OFM
- Prelate of Jesús María del Nayar
- Church: Catholic Church
- See: Territorial Prelature of Jesús María del Nayar
- In office: 27 June 1992 – 27 February 2010
- Predecessor: Manuel Arvizu
- Successor: José de Jesús González Hernández
- Previous post: Coadjutor Prelate of Jesús María del Nayar (1990-1992)

Orders
- Ordination: 20 June 1976
- Consecration: 4 April 1990 by Girolamo Prigione

Personal details
- Born: 20 December 1947 Mexico City, Mexico
- Died: 8 July 2020 (aged 72) Tepic, Nayarit, Mexico

José Antonio Pérez Sánchez (20 December 1947 – 8 July 2020) was a Mexican Roman Catholic bishop.

Pérez Sanchéz was born in Mexico and was ordained to the priesthood in 1976. He served as coadjutor bishop of the Territorial Prelature of Jesús María del Nayar from 1992 to 1994 and as bishop of the territorial prelature from 1994 to 2010.
