= San Francisco de Asís, Atotonilco El Alto =

San Francisco de Asis San Francisco de Asís (Spanish)
- Town

Saint Francis of Assisi transcription(s)
- Nickname: San Pancho
- Motto(s): Trabajadores de la tierra y soldados de la Fe (Workers of the land and soldiers of the Faith)
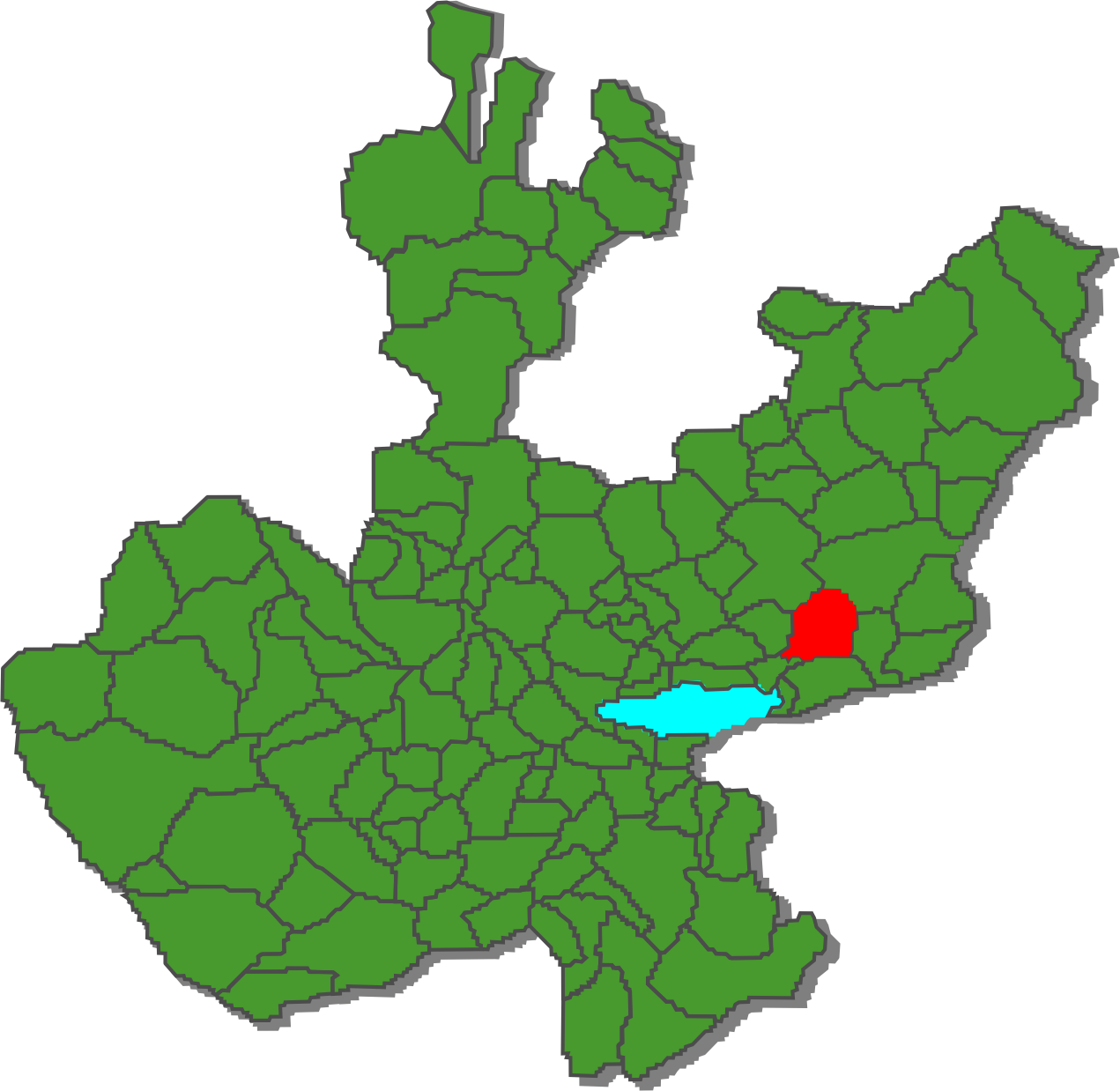
- Location of the municipality in Jalisco

- Location in Mexico
- Coordinates: 20°32′N 102°30′W
- Country: Mexico
- State: Jalisco
- Established: 1802

Government
  - Municipal delegate: José de Jesús Fonseca Torres
- Elevation: 2,000 m (6,600 ft)

Population (2020)
  - Total: 5,167

San Francisco de Asís is a town within the municipality of Atotonilco El Alto, located in the southeastern part of the state of Jalisco, Mexico. It is named after Saint Francis of Assisi, an Italian Catholic saint and founder of the Franciscan Order. According to the 2020 census, the town had a population of 5,167 inhabitants.

The town’s most notable features include the Shrine of Our Lady of Los Altos (Nuestra Señora de los Altos) and the presence of new tequila production facilities in the surrounding area.

The municipality of Atotonilco el Alto covers an area of 1,532.78 km² (591.81 sq mi). According to the 2005 census, it had a total population of 126,625 inhabitants. Since 2005, the municipality has experienced continued development, including residential expansion and the construction of new churches and schools.

== Early Formation and Origins ==
San Francisco de Asís, located in the Los Altos region of Jalisco, Mexico, developed gradually from scattered ranch settlements that were originally part of large colonial landholdings. The area was historically associated with Hacienda de San Ignacio Cerro Gordo (also known as La Trasquiela), which was later divided into smaller estates over time.

By the early 19th century, land in the region had been transferred and worked by several families, including Hernández and Fonseca, who managed livestock ranching under a sharecropping system. Much of the local economy was based on cattle raising and small-scale agricultural production.

During the late colonial and early national periods, settlement in the region remained dispersed across ranches and small communities. By the early 20th century, La Estanzuela, one of the early population centers served as the core settlement that would later become San Francisco de Asís.

=== Toponymy ===
The name San Francisco de Asís refers to Francis of Assisi, a Catholic saint and founder of the Franciscan Order. The toponym is therefore of religious origin and is interpreted as meaning “Saint Francis of Assisi.”

The settlement was formally dedicated to its patron saint in 1917, when it was established as an ecclesiastical vicariate centered in the community of La Estanzuela. From this point onward, the name San Francisco de Asís was used as the official ecclesiastical designation of the locality.

Beginning in 1933, the Mexican federal government did not recognize the traditional name in official civil records, adopting instead the name “Francisco Javier Mina,” in honor of the insurgent leader Francisco Xavier Mina. Despite this administrative designation, the traditional name continued to be used in local, social, and ecclesiastical contexts. The original name was formally restored in 1995.

The municipality of Atotonilco el Alto forms part of the Los Altos de Jalisco region, an area historically characterized by dispersed rural settlements and former hacienda-based land tenure systems.

== The foundation of San Francisco de Asís ==
San Francisco de Asís is located in the heart of Los Altos de Jalisco, a region that was originally part of a single large hacienda system, mainly the Hacienda of San Ignacio Cerro Gordo (also called La Trasquiela).

According to tradition, this large estate was later divided by missionary friars, although there is no solid historical proof of this claim. From the 18th century onward, the land was gradually divided into smaller haciendas and ranches.

A Spanish landowner, Juan Noriega, later sold the property to the families Hernández and Fonseca, who managed the land mainly through sharecropping (aparcería), especially for cattle raising.

By the early 20th century:

- Around 5,000 people lived scattered in about 35 ranching communities
- Most families worked as sharecroppers or ranch laborers
- Some were small landowners or artisans
- The main families mentioned in the region were:
  - Hernández (originally from La Soledad)
  - Fonseca (originally from Salamanca, Guanajuato)
  - Angulo (settled in La Soledad, originally from Puebla de Zaragoza)
  - Navarro (originally from Tepatitlán de Morelos)

These families held most of the local land, but the system was not based on large plantations. Instead, it functioned through small ranches and sharecropping arrangements.

== Early Settlement Pattern (La Estanzuela to San Francisco de Asís) ==
- The original settlement was called La Estanzuela, with only a few houses (about five jacales initially).
- It was part of a rural network of rancherías (around 35 communities and scattered farms).
- Families lived from:
  - cattle raising (especially dairy)
  - small-scale agriculture
  - sharecropping systems

== Religious Foundation and Community Development ==
In 1917, a local priest, Father J. Jesús Angulo, successfully petitioned ecclesiastical authorities in Guadalajara to establish La Estanzuela as a church vicariate. This ecclesiastical decision formally marked the foundation of San Francisco de Asís as a religious community.

Following this change, Father Angulo led efforts to organize the settlement, constructing a church, school, and municipal buildings. These projects were carried out largely through community labor, where residents contributed unpaid collective work to build infrastructure such as roads, public spaces, and religious buildings.

By the early 1920s, the settlement had developed into a small but organized town with streets, a central plaza, a church, and approximately one thousand inhabitants. The town became a local center for religious life, education, and social gathering.

=== Religious and civic foundation (1917–1922) ===
In 1917, Father Angulo obtained permission from Archbishop Francisco Orozco y Jiménez to convert the small settlement of La Estanzuela (about five houses) into a church vicariate. From this decision, the community of San Francisco de Asís was officially born by ecclesiastical decree.

Father Angulo:

- Built a church and a school
- Organized a municipal building
- Improved local roads and infrastructure
- Encouraged collective unpaid labor known as “faena”

By 1922, the town already had:

- Streets
- A plaza
- A church
- Around 1,000 inhabitants

Most of this work was done through community labor without payment, where families contributed work collectively.

== Town of San Francisco de Asís during the Cristero War (January 9, 1927) ==
According to historian Jean Meyer, San Francisco de Asís, in the Los Altos region of Jalisco, played an important role in the beginning of the Cristero War. The town rose in mass on January 9, 1927, marking its active participation in the religious conflict known as the Cristiada.

=== The priest Angulo (José de Jesús Angulo del Valle y Navarro) ===
The parish priest at that time was Father Angulo, a young priest born in the region. According to Meyer:

- He tried to prevent the armed uprising
- He attempted to stop his parishioners from joining the rebellion
- He had previously had conflicts with the governor of Jalisco
- He was quickly labeled by authorities as a “warrior priest”

However, the official version claiming that he personally led the armed attack on the La Barca train (April 19, 1927) has been widely repeated in many books, but Meyer states that this version is completely incorrect.

In reality, Father Angulo opposed the violent uprising in San Francisco de Asís and wrote critically about armed priest Reyes Vega, whom he strongly disapproved of.

This shows that:

Father Angulo was not a military leader of the Cristeros, but rather a parish priest caught between his community, Church authority, and government pressure.

=== Cristero uprising in San Francisco de Asís (1927) ===
The document states that on January 9, 1927, the town became one of the first centers of armed resistance in Los Altos de Jalisco.

San Francisco de Asís became what Meyer describes as:

The “crater” of the volcanic eruption of the Cristero movement in the region.

From there, armed resistance spread through Los Altos, and the region became known nationally and internationally for its Catholic uprising.

However, the document also emphasizes that:

- The priest did not fully support the armed rebellion
- The uprising came from the population itself
- The movement reflected strong local religious identity

=== Legacy ===
The Cristero War left a lasting impact on San Francisco de Asís and surrounding ranches. Many families were displaced, persecuted, or forced into migration. Despite this, the community preserved:

- Strong Catholic identity
- Family-based ranch culture
- Oral historical memory of the Cristero period
- Migration connections to other parts of Mexico and the United States

== The Martyrdom of Blessed Miguel Gómez Loza (March 21, 1928) ==
Situated roughly 1.5 miles southeast of the main Shrine at geographic coordinates 20.57932, -102.546137 is El Lindero Ranch (nearby San Francisco de Asís). Today, a commemorative stone arch marks this precise point, honoring the location where Blessed Miguel Gómez Loza, the appointed Civil Governor of the Cristero movement, was killed by federal forces on March 21, 1928.

=== The Ambush at the Farmhouse ===
Earlier that month, addressing a critical administrative emergency, Governor Gómez Loza packed sensitive war intelligence documents into a worn leather briefcase and evacuated his base in Palmitos. He was accompanied by two trusted aides: Macario Hernández (the local civil chief of Atotonilco El Alto) and his personal secretary, José Dionicio “Nicho” Vázquez Fonseca.

Attempting to bypass fortified military checkpoints, the three men took a winding southerly route toward Guadalajara. They stopped to rest their horses at a rural farmhouse on the El Lindero property that had been abandoned due to the government's forced reconcentración decrees. Suddenly, a federal cavalry of at least twenty mounted soldiers under the command of Division General Jesús María Ferreira Knappe (1889–1938) advanced on the neighboring farm. These federal troops, operating more like marauding thieves, brought along cargo donkeys to pillage and carry away local corn harvests.

=== The Sacrifice of the Briefcase ===
Because they were completely cut off from their tied horses, Gómez Loza ordered an immediate tactical retreat into the surrounding brush, telling his men to scatter. While his assistants fled, Miguel delayed his own escape to secure the leather briefcase, choosing to manually protect the secret identities of covert civilian operatives and hidden rebel base positions rather than save his own life.

While Macario Hernández successfully concealed himself inside a nearby plumbago bush and watched the encounter, Governor Gómez Loza and "Nicho" Vázquez were captured by the cavalry. The soldiers brutally beat the civil governor, bound him by his limbs with a lasso to a saddle horn, and dragged him violently across the rocky pastures and hillsides. When the mount finally stopped, Gómez Loza lay dead face down in the dirt, still wearing a small metal medal of Our Lady pinned over his heart.

=== The Witness of "Nicho" Vázquez ===
Though Governor Gómez Loza was martyred that day, his personal secretary, José Dionicio "Nicho" Vázquez Fonseca, survived the captivity and the war to become the essential historical gatekeeper for the region. Decades later, in the year 2000, "Nicho" worked directly under the canonical direction of Bishop Javier Navarro to compile these eyewitness accounts and formalize the Vatican causes for canonization for his fallen comrades, ensuring the legacy of what transpired at the Adobes River and El Lindero would be permanently preserved.

== The Martyrs of Silence (The Los Adobes Massacre August 12, 1928) ==
The Santuario de Nuestra Señora de Guadalupe, Reina de los Mártires Cristeros (English: Shrine of Our Lady of Guadalupe, Queen of the Cristero Martyrs) honors the profound spiritual resilience of ten local lay Catholics who were executed during the Cristero War (1926–1929). Formally recognized in regional history as The Martyrs of Silence, these individuals were targeted by the Mexican federal government's severe anti-clerical campaigns. Their collective memory, long suppressed in official state records, was preserved for generations through local oral traditions.

=== The Events of August 11, 1928 ===
The tragedy began late in the afternoon when a federal unit of approximately 200 cavalrymen, led by General Juan Domínguez Garza, marched from Tepatitlán toward Arandas along the Sanjuanero route. To isolate the Cristero resistance, the government had enacted a mandatory "concentration" decree, legally forcing rural populations into major urban centers. Anyone remaining in the countryside without an authorized government safe-conduct pass faced immediate arrest.

- Capture at Guadalupe Ranch: At around 5:00 PM, federal troops intercepted five agricultural laborers at the Guadalupe property. While Marcos González Hernández was temporarily spared because he possessed a valid travel permit, the remaining four men were detained: Ángel Hernández Angulo, J. Reyes Fonseca Hernández, Eusebio Angulo Fonseca, and J. Guadalupe Angulo Fonseca.
- Capture at Los Adobes Ranch: As the military column advanced to the Los Adobes property, they apprehended five additional citizens: Juan Vázquez, Alberto Padilla, Máximo Campos, J. de Jesús Angulo, and a local barber named Jesús Orozco.
- The Final Capture: Desperate to secure the release of his brother-in-law, Ángel Hernández, a resident named Agustín Coss y León intercepted the column and offered General Domínguez a substantial cash ransom, which was flatly denied. Simultaneously, Marcos González heroicly returned to the camp with the missing permits for his companions. Enraged by his return, General Domínguez revoked his freedom, stating that he would also face the gallows the following morning. He became the tenth captive.

=== The Vigil at Cerro el Viborero ===
The ten prisoners were transferred to a stable at a small estate on Cerro el Viborero for the night. Under the spiritual leadership of Ángel Hernández, the men spent their final hours singing religious hymns and reciting the Rosary. When a federal guard ordered them to remain silent, the prisoners famously responded:

"Only with the bullets will we shut up."

This exchange was documented by Roque Hernández, a local People's Commissioner who had followed the troops to plead for the men's lives. When he continued to protest their innocence, General Domínguez threatened him with execution as well.

=== Executions at the Adobes River (August 12, 1928) ===
The following morning, the ten captives were marched to the banks of the Adobes River, an area dense with ash trees selected for the executions. In an effort to terrorize the local community, federal forces coerced local elderly citizens and women from their homes to watch the hangings as a public warning.

Two remarkable acts of bravery occurred during the executions:

1. The Sacrifice of Alberto Padilla: When soldiers prepared to execute his father, Valerio Padilla, 22-year-old Alberto stepped forward and volunteered to take his place. The commanding general accepted the trade, and Alberto was martyred in his father's stead.
2. The Escape Attempt of Eusebio Angulo: As his execution approached, 20-year-old Eusebio Angulo attempted a desperate flight. Soldiers opened fire, wounding him in the leg, before beating him and dragging him back to the ash trees to be hanged.

To maximize the psychological impact, the military prohibited anyone from removing the bodies. Defying these explicit orders, local residents held a secret overnight vigil near the trees. In the early hours of August 13, the bodies were cut down and taken to Atotonilco el Alto. Civil registrar José Gutiérrez M. officially documented that the ten men were executed by federal forces without medical attention, and they were interred in a third-class communal grave.

=== The Museo de Mártires de Adobes and Memorial Chapel ===
The historic site of the execution along the riverbank is precisely marked today by a dedicated memorial chapel and museum complex located at geographic coordinates 20.653387, -102.490021.

The building housing the Museo de Mártires de Adobes holds immense spiritual significance for the community, as it is the preservation of the original house that served as the birthplace and childhood home of Father Hilario Hernández González. The museum exhibits preserve local Cristero artifacts, oral histories, and documentation regarding the martyrdoms. Immediately adjacent to this building sits the memorial chapel, erected by the local faithful directly on the riverbank ground where the ash trees stood and the ten innocent men were executed.

== Shrines of San Francisco de Asís ==
=== Santuario de Nuestra Señora de los Altos ===
The devotion to Nuestra Señora de los Altos (English: Our Lady of the Highlands) is a Marian title venerated in the Los Altos de Jalisco region of Mexico. It is associated with local Catholic devotional life centered in the parish of San Francisco de Asís, where it developed as part of regional religious identity.

According to parish tradition, in 1929 the parish priest José de Jesús Angulo donated a small image of the Virgin Mary under the title of the Immaculate Conception to the community of San Francisco de Asís following the resumption of public worship in the area. This image later became the focal point of local Marian devotion under the title Nuestra Señora de los Altos.

A significant event in the history of the devotion occurred on November 1, 1940, when the image was solemnly crowned during a Mass presided over by ecclesiastical authorities. The ceremony is traditionally associated with Cardinal Luis María Martínez, Archbishop of Mexico, and Archbishop José Garibi y Rivera of Guadalajara, who participated in the coronation celebration. The event marked formal recognition of the devotion within the broader Catholic liturgical and devotional life of the region.

The shrine and devotion remain closely linked to the religious identity of Los Altos de Jalisco, a region historically characterized by strong parish organization and Marian devotion. A replica or related devotional image is also reported at St. John the Baptist Parish in Harvey, Illinois, reflecting the continuation of this tradition among Mexican diaspora communities.

=== Santuario de Nuestra Señora de Guadalupe, Reina de los Mártires Cristeros ===
The Santuario de Nuestra Señora de Guadalupe, Reina de los Mártires Cristeros (English: Shrine of Our Lady of Guadalupe, Queen of the Cristero Martyrs) serves as the central ecclesiastical monument and pilgrimage destination anchoring the sacred history of the region. Rather than a standard parish church, the sanctuary functions as a living memorial dedicated to preserving three distinct pillars of local faith and historical sacrifice:

- The Ten Los Adobes Martyrs: It acts as the primary monument honoring the "Martyrs of Silence"—the ten agrarian citizens executed by federal troops along the Adobes River on August 12, 1928.
- The Relic of Blessed Miguel Gómez Loza: It serves as a solemn repository for the physical relic of the Cristero movement's Civil Governor, who was martyred nearby at El Lindero Ranch on March 21, 1928.
- The Tomb of Father Hilario Hernández González: It houses the final resting place of this revered priest, serving as a highly frequented local pilgrimage site where the faithful continuously gather to seek his pastoral intercession. Though his cause has not been formally processed by the Holy See, he is widely regarded by regional communities as a holy figure. His tomb remains an active site of pilgrimage, where local Catholics frequently gather to pray and seek his spiritual intercession.

== Ancestry ==
Traditionally, the region of San Francisco de Asís, Jalisco is associated with a population shaped primarily by Spanish colonial-era settlement, later regional migration within Mexico, and strong Roman Catholic cultural traditions. Family networks and religious identity have historically played a central role in community life.

The families Hernández, Angulo, Vázquez, Rodríguez, Navarro, and Fonseca are among those historically linked to early settlement in the town and surrounding ranching areas. These families are generally understood to have Hispanic (Spanish-origin) roots, with migration patterns connecting them to other regions of central and western Mexico over time, including Jalisco and nearby states.

Like many communities in Los Altos de Jalisco, ancestry in the region reflects mixed historical influences, including Indigenous peoples of central Mexico and Spanish colonial settlers. However, most documented local family lineages are primarily mestizo with strong Spanish cultural heritage, shaped through the hacienda and ranching systems of the region.

In the modern period, many descendants from these families have migrated abroad for economic opportunities. A significant number of expatriates now reside in the United States, particularly in metropolitan areas such as California, Houston, Chicago, Nashville, and South Dallas, where community ties are maintained through family networks and migration chains.

== Community Life and Plaza Culture ==
The main plaza of San Francisco de Asís, Jalisco became the heart of community life. It served as an open public space with seating areas, fountains, and occasional market stalls or kiosks during events.

On Sundays, the plaza filled with residents of all ages who gathered after attending Catholic Mass. Activities included walking, socializing, visiting relatives, and sharing meals. Surrounding the plaza were small businesses such as bakeries, ice cream vendors, and food stalls that supported local commerce.

=== Sunday Tradition and Social Life ===
A traditional Sunday in San Francisco de Asís typically begins with attendance at Catholic Mass, followed by family and social gatherings. After church, many residents either:

- Visit nearby relatives
- Share meals with family or friends
- Spend time in the plaza or local town center

This weekly rhythm reflects the community’s strong emphasis on religion, family, and social connection, which remains an important part of local identity, even as lifestyles continue to evolve.

=== Traditional Plaza Customs (Historical Context) ===
In earlier generations in Los Altos de Jalisco, plaza traditions such as walking around the plaza (“dar la vuelta”), social gatherings, and courtship customs took place every Sunday evening as part of regular community life.

Over time, these traditions have changed. What was once a weekly social and courtship activity in the plaza is now less common and is mostly seen during annual town fairs (ferias), patron saint festivals, or special community celebrations.

In some older traditions, young people would walk the plaza in opposite directions as a form of social interaction. Courtship could include respectful gestures such as exchanging looks, brief conversation under family supervision, or offering flowers. In festive contexts, playful expressions such as confetti or paper decorations were sometimes part of social celebrations.

Today, Sunday evenings in the plaza are still important for gathering and social life, but the older structured courtship customs are now mostly preserved in memory or during larger community events rather than as a weekly practice.
