= Territorial Prelature of Jesús María del Nayar =

Roman Catholic ecclesiastical jurisdiction in Mexico

Coordinates: 20°40′39″N 104°17′03″W

Territorial Prelature of Jesús María del Nayar Praelatura Territorialis Nayariana de Iesu et Maria Prélature Territoriale de Jesús María del Nayar

Location
- Country: Mexico
- Ecclesiastical province: Province of Guadalajara
- Metropolitan: Jesús María, Nayarit

Statistics
- Area: 25,000 km^{2} (9,700 sq mi)
- Population: Total; Catholics: (as of 2023); 155,000; 139,000 (89.7%)
- Parishes: 16

Information
- Denomination: Catholic Church
- Sui iuris church: Latin Church
- Rite: Roman Rite
- Established: 13 January 1962; 64 years ago
- Cathedral: Cathedral of Jesus and Mary
- Secular priests: 27 (15 diocesan, 12 religious orders)

Current leadership
- Pope: Leo XIV
- Prelate: Andrés Sáinz Márquez
- Metropolitan Archbishop: Francisco Robles Ortega

Map
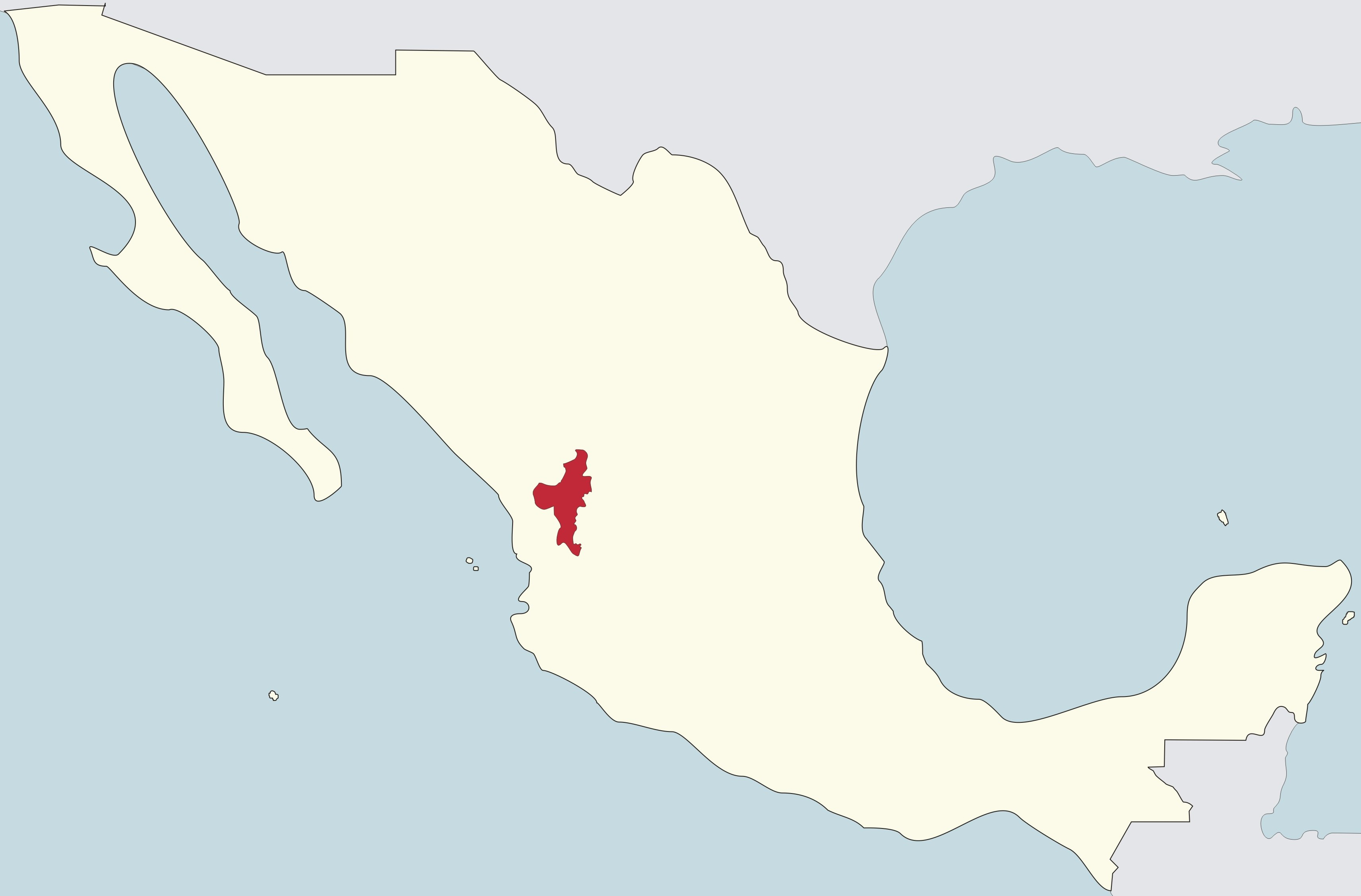

The Roman Catholic Territorial Prelature of Jesús María (del Nayar) (Latin: Praelatura Territorialis Nayariana de Iesu et Maria) (erected 13 January 1962) is a suffragan of the Archdiocese of Guadalajara in Mexico. The episcopal see is in Jesús María, Nayarit.

== Prelates ==
- Manuel Arvizu, O.F.M. (1962–1992), resigned
- José Antonio Pérez Sánchez, O.F.M. (1992–2010), resigned
- José de Jesús González Hernández, O.F.M. (2010–2022), appointed Bishop of Chilpancingo-Chilapa
- Andrés Sáinz Márquez (2025–present)

=== Coadjutor prelate ===
- José Antonio Pérez Sánchez, O.F.M. (1990–1992)

== External links and references ==
- "Territorial Prelature of Jesús María (del Nayar)". Catholic-Hierarchy.
