= Benjamín Jiménez Hernández =

Mexican bishop (1938–2020)

- Bishop of Culiacán
- Church: Catholic Church
- Diocese: Diocese of Culiacán
- In office: 4 October 1993 – 11 March 2011
- Predecessor: Luis Rojas Mena
- Successor: Jonás Guerrero Corona
- Previous posts: Titular Bishop of Sullectum (1989-1993); Auxiliary Bishop of Culiacán (1989-1993)

Orders
- Ordination: 28 July 1963
- Consecration: 29 June 1989 by Girolamo Prigione

Personal details
- Born: 31 March 1938 Pénjamo, Guanajuato, Mexico
- Died: 26 November 2020 (aged 82) Hermosillo, Sonora, Mexico

Benjamin Jiménez Hernández (31 March 1938 – 26 November 2020) was a Mexican Roman Catholic bishop.

Jiménez Hernández was born in Mexico and was ordained to the priesthood in 1963.

He served as titular bishop of Sellectum and as auxiliary bishop of the Roman Catholic Diocese of Culiacán, Mexico from 1989 to 1993 and then as bishop of the diocese from 1993 to 2011.

Hernández died from COVID-19 in 2020, at the age of 84, during the COVID-19 pandemic in Mexico.
