= José del Valle =

José del Valle may refer to:

- José Cecilio del Valle (1780–1834), American philosopher, politician, lawyer, and journalist
- José Luis del Valle (1901–1983), Spanish lawyer
- José de Jesús Angulo del Valle y Navarro (1888−1966), Mexican Roman Catholic bishop
- José del Valle (politician), Mexican politician and secretary of the interior
