= Atotonilco El Alto =

- Municipality and town
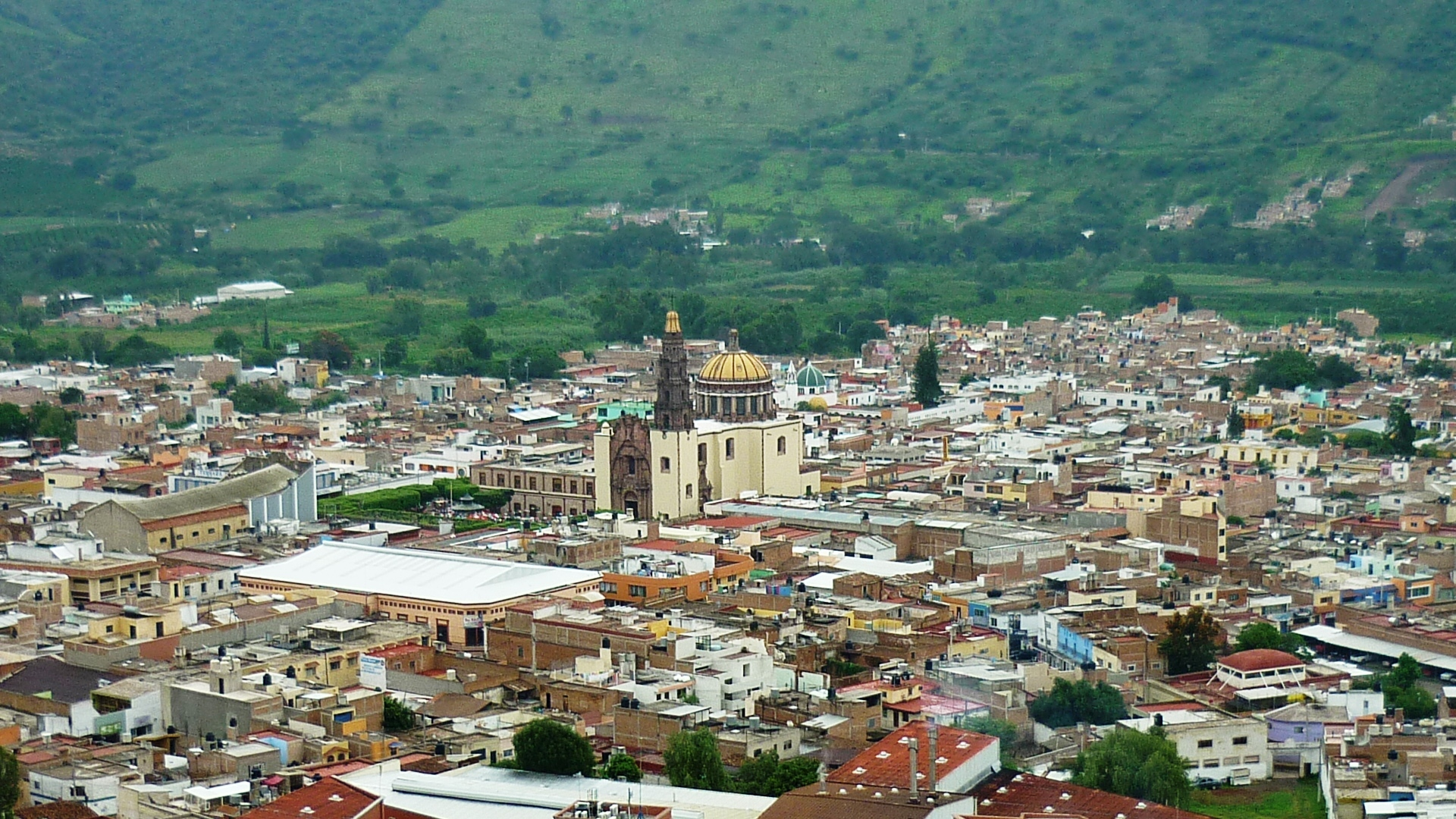

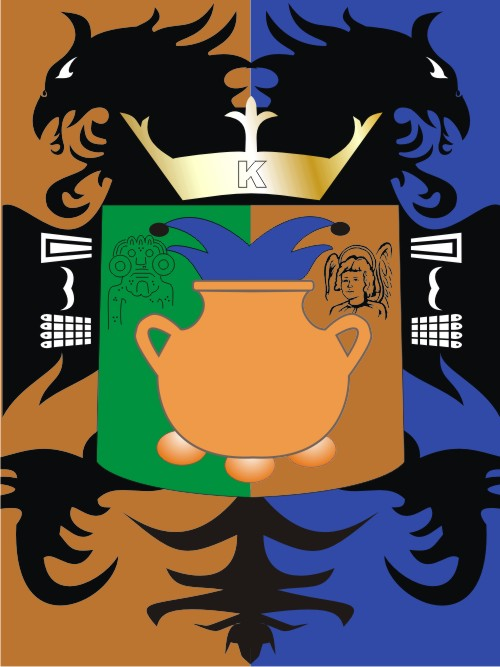
- Flag Coat of arms

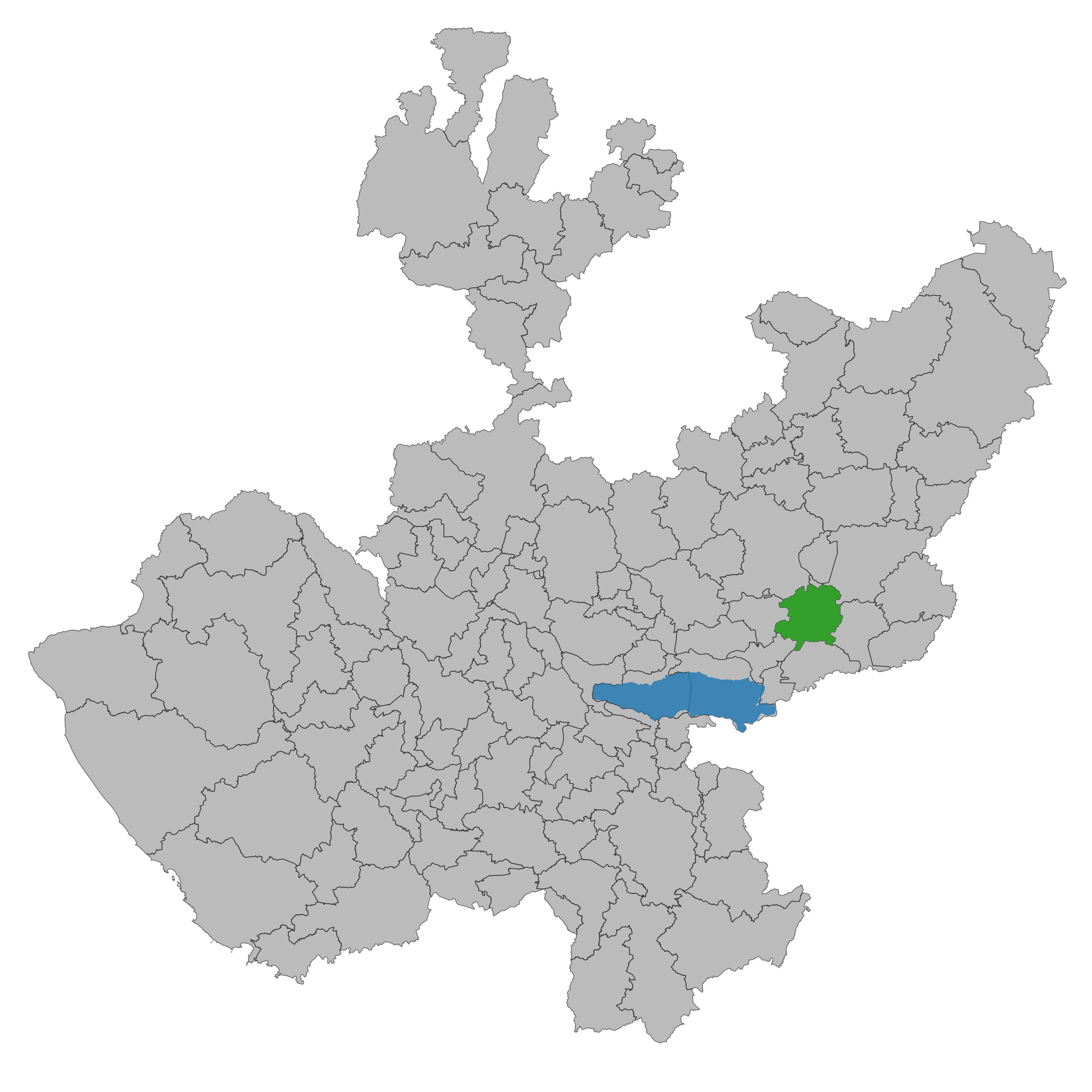
- Location of the municipality in Jalisco

- Location in Mexico
- Coordinates: 20°32′N 102°30′W
- Country: Mexico
- State: Jalisco

Area
  - Total: 510.9 km^{2} (197.3 sq mi)
  - Town: 6.25 km^{2} (2.41 sq mi)

Population (2020 census)
  - Total: 64,009
  - Density: 125.3/km^{2} (324.5/sq mi)
  - Town: 28,678
  - Town density: 4,590/km^{2} (11,900/sq mi)
- Website: atotonilco.gob.mx

Atotonilco El Alto is a town and municipality, in Jalisco in Los Altos (Jalisco) region in central-western Mexico. The municipality covers an area of 510.9 km^{2}.

Atotonilco (pronounced ah-toh-toh-NEAL-co) means "place of hot waters", in Náhuatl. "El Alto"("The High One") was later added in honor of those who died in the Cristero War in the early 1920s.

As of 2020, the municipality had a total population of 64,009.

== History ==
The town was first established by the Purépecha in late 1400, according to Purépecha myth. The region was conquered in June 1530 by the Nuño de Guzmán. Martin del Campo was the first encomendero and the evangelization of the region was entrusted to the Franciscans. Atotonilco in 1551 was given in encomienda to the conquistador Andrés de Villanueva. In November 1824 the State Congress ruled that the village of Atotonilco hereafter would have the title of town, and would also be the head of the department which includes Arandas and Ayotlán. On May 15, 1868, the governor of Jalisco, Antonio Gómez Cuervo, elevated the status of Atotonilco to a city, which it retains to this day.

== Atotonilco El Alto municipality ==
The municipality of Atotonilco El Alto has 112 towns. Atotonilco El Alto, Cienega del Pastor, Milpillas, La Santa Rosa, La Cofradia, San Francisco de Asís, Santa Elena, La Guadalupana, San Joaquin, Ojo de Agua de Morán, El Agua Caliente, El Nacimiento, San Jose del Valle, San Joaquin, San Antonio de Fernandez, Nuevo Valle, Margaritas, La Purisma, Los Adobes and more.

== Climate ==
Climate data for Atotonilco El Alto (1991–2020 normals, extremes 1941–present)
Month	Jan	Feb	Mar	Apr	May	Jun	Jul	Aug	Sep	Oct	Nov	Dec	Year
Record high °C (°F)	34.5 (94.1)	38 (100)	39 (102)	37 (99)	39.5 (103.1)	39.5 (103.1)	39.5 (103.1)	34 (93)	35 (95)	33.5 (92.3)	35 (95)	35.5 (95.9)	39.5 (103.1)
Mean daily maximum °C (°F)	25.3 (77.5)	27.6 (81.7)	29.8 (85.6)	32.0 (89.6)	33.0 (91.4)	30.7 (87.3)	28.7 (83.7)	28.6 (83.5)	28.3 (82.9)	28.2 (82.8)	27.0 (80.6)	25.5 (77.9)	28.7 (83.7)
Daily mean °C (°F)	15.8 (60.4)	17.5 (63.5)	19.4 (66.9)	21.3 (70.3)	23.4 (74.1)	23.3 (73.9)	22.0 (71.6)	21.9 (71.4)	21.6 (70.9)	20.3 (68.5)	18.2 (64.8)	16.4 (61.5)	20.1 (68.2)
Mean daily minimum °C (°F)	6.4 (43.5)	7.4 (45.3)	9.0 (48.2)	10.7 (51.3)	13.8 (56.8)	16.0 (60.8)	15.3 (59.5)	15.2 (59.4)	15.0 (59.0)	12.4 (54.3)	9.4 (48.9)	7.2 (45.0)	11.5 (52.7)
Record low °C (°F)	0.5 (32.9)	−2 (28)	2 (36)	0.5 (32.9)	4.5 (40.1)	7 (45)	5.5 (41.9)	7 (45)	4 (39)	0.5 (32.9)	0.5 (32.9)	0 (32)	−2 (28)
Average precipitation mm (inches)	17.9 (0.70)	14.5 (0.57)	10.4 (0.41)	2.9 (0.11)	45.0 (1.77)	160.5 (6.32)	210.5 (8.29)	186.4 (7.34)	157.2 (6.19)	50.0 (1.97)	13.6 (0.54)	6.1 (0.24)	875.0 (34.45)
Average precipitation days	2.3	2.0	1.4	0.9	4.8	14.9	18.7	17.9	15.3	7.0	2.9	1.6	89.7
Source: Servicio Meteorológico Nacional

== Taretan Water Park ==
In 1950, Taretan Water Park started functioning as a natural hot spring bath and an amusement place for families located at the sides of the Taretan River. Taretan was founded in the highlands of Jalisco. It was remodeled in the mid-1920s and now it houses a stone statue of St. Michael Archangel the Patron Saint of Atotonilco. It also has several sheds with tables and chairs made out of stone, dressing rooms, and a playground for young children to play. This park is mostly known for its waters. Hispanic legend of this place claims that the waters in Taretan have healing properties.

== Notable people ==
- Venerable Maria Luisa de la Peña, Mexican Roman Catholic nun and founder of the Carmelite Sisters of the Most Sacred Heart of Los Angeles
- José Trinidad Sepúlveda Ruiz-Velasco, Bishop of San Juan de los Lagos, Jalisco
- General Enrique Gorostieta was killed there during the Cristero War.
