= Ojo de Agua =

Ojo de Agua may refer to:

- Ojo de Agua, Dominican Republic, a village near Salcedo that was home to the Mirabal sisters
- Ojo de Agua (Camajuaní), a town in Aguada de Moya, Cuba
- Ojo de Agua, Chiapas, a town in Mazatán, Chiapas, Mexico
- Ojo de Agua, Tecámac, a neighborhood in Tecámac, State of Mexico
  - Ojo de Agua (Mexibús), a BRT station in Tecamac, Mexico
- Ojo de Agua de Morán, Jalisco
- Ojos de Agua, Comayagua, a municipality in Honduras
- Ojo de Agua, a spring in El Parterre plaza, Aguadilla, Puerto Rico
