= Pascual Díaz y Barreto =

Mexican Catholic bishop (1876–1936)

The Most Reverend Pascual Díaz y Barreto, S.J.
- Archbishop of Mexico
- See: Mexico
- Installed: June 22, 1929
- Term ended: May 19, 1936
- Predecessor: José Mora y del Rio
- Successor: Luis María Martínez
- Previous post: Bishop of Tabasco (1923–1927)

Orders
- Ordination: 1896
- Consecration: February 2, 1923 by Maximino Ruiz y Flores

Personal details
- Born: June 22, 1876 Zapopan, Jalisco
- Died: May 19, 1936 (aged 59) Mexico City, Mexico
- Denomination: Roman Catholic Church

Styles of Pascual Díaz y Barreto
- Reference style: The Right Reverend
- Spoken style: Your Excellency
- Religious style: Bishop
- Posthumous style: none

The Most Reverend Pascual Díaz y Barreto, SJ (June 22, 1876 – May 19, 1936) was a Mexican prelate of the Catholic Church, who served as Archbishop of Mexico City from June 22, 1929 until his death in 1936. Throughout his tenure, he frequently came into conflict with the anti-Catholic Mexican government.

== Biography ==
Born in Zapopan, Jalisco, to a family of pure Huichol Indians, Pascual Díaz y Barreto was ordained to the priesthood in 1896 and incardinated into the Society of Jesus, more commonly known as the Jesuits, on October 9, 1903.

On December 11, 1922, he was appointed the sixth Bishop of Tabasco by Pope Pius XI. Díaz received his episcopal consecration on February 2, 1923 from Bishop Maximino Ruiz y Flores, and was installed as Tabasco's ordinary on the following February 28. In 1927, he was sent into exile for carrying out his ministry in a manner which violated the country's Constitution. Díaz was later named Archbishop of Mexico City on June 25, 1929, as a signal of peace following Pope Pius's sanction of the plan of settlement to end the feud between the Mexican Church and the State.

In late December 1930, the Archbishop issued a scathing denunciation of Protestantism in Mexico, claiming, "There is solid ground for believing that North American Protestant sects, moved by political motives, seek to aggravate religious perturbation in Mexico...The names Protestant, Methodist, and Presbyterian fall on Mexicans as a species of stigma because of the marked character of the North American dominion all these Protestants bring to Mexico. Hence the popular opinion that Protestantism is one of the elements upon which a powerful neighboring nation counts to effect slowly but surely domination, hegemony or realization of its imperialism in our land".

A year later, he condemned a bill that would prohibit religions from being represented in Mexico by more than one clergyman per 50,000 as "an unheard of outrage of the public power against religion". He stated, "It does not merit the name of law...it opposes the positive dispositions of God and the teachings of the Church, the authentic and infallible organ established by Jesus Christ our Lord..." Díaz unsuccessfully urged President Pascual Ortiz Rubio towards a veto, and, despite the large number of Catholic priests in Mexico, ordered the clergy under his jurisdiction to remain in their posts.

Archbishop Díaz rejected the claim of anti-Catholic Plutarco Elías Calles that the Mexican episcopate were "organizing in preparation for a movement," or revolution, saying that Catholics are obliged "to preserve the immutable principles of justice and morality". He later threatened Calles, as well as government employees, parents who sent their children to government-operated schools and the children themselves, the teachers of those schools, and any other Catholic who supported the government with excommunication in 1935. However, no such excommunication was pronounced, and Díaz pardoned in advance those government employees who kept their occupations because they could not find work otherwise and those parents who sent their children to proscribed schools under pressure from the truant officer. Later that year, in March, he was arrested by traffic police to leave his car and enter theirs, kept sitting parked in a suburb of Mexico City for over two hours, and then taken to a police station where he sat all night; according to the Archbishop's private secretary, he subsequently suffered "from severe cramps and head pains". Although he agreed to a fine of 100 pesos as well, he did not pay.

In 1936, the primate published a pastoral letter enforcing the Church's stance against Socialism. In it he described Catholics who practiced, studied, or taught Socialism as guilty of mortal sin, and said, "No Catholic can be a Socialist, understanding by Socialism the philosophical, economic or social system which, in one form or another, does not recognize the rights of God and the Church, nor the natural right of every man to possess the goods he has acquired..."

Archbishop Díaz died from colitis in Mexico City, at the age of 59.

Religious titles
Preceded by Antonio Hernández y Rodríguez	Bishop of Tabasco; 1922–1929	Succeeded by Vicente Camacho y Moya
Preceded by José Mora y del Rio	Archbishop of Mexico City; 1929–1936	Succeeded by Luis María Martínez
