= José Antonio Pérez =

José Antonio Pérez may refer to:

- José Antonio Pérez-Cotapos (fl. early 19th century), Chilean military officer and politician
- José Antonio Pérez Gabarain (born 1944), Spanish politician, three-term mayor of Andoain
- José Antonio Pérez Sánchez (1947–2020), Mexican prelate of the Roman Catholic Church
- José Antonio Pérez Tapias (born 1955), Spanish politician and academic
