= Chilpancingo Cathedral =

St. Mary of the Assumption Cathedral
- Catedral de Santa María de la Asunción de Chilpancingo
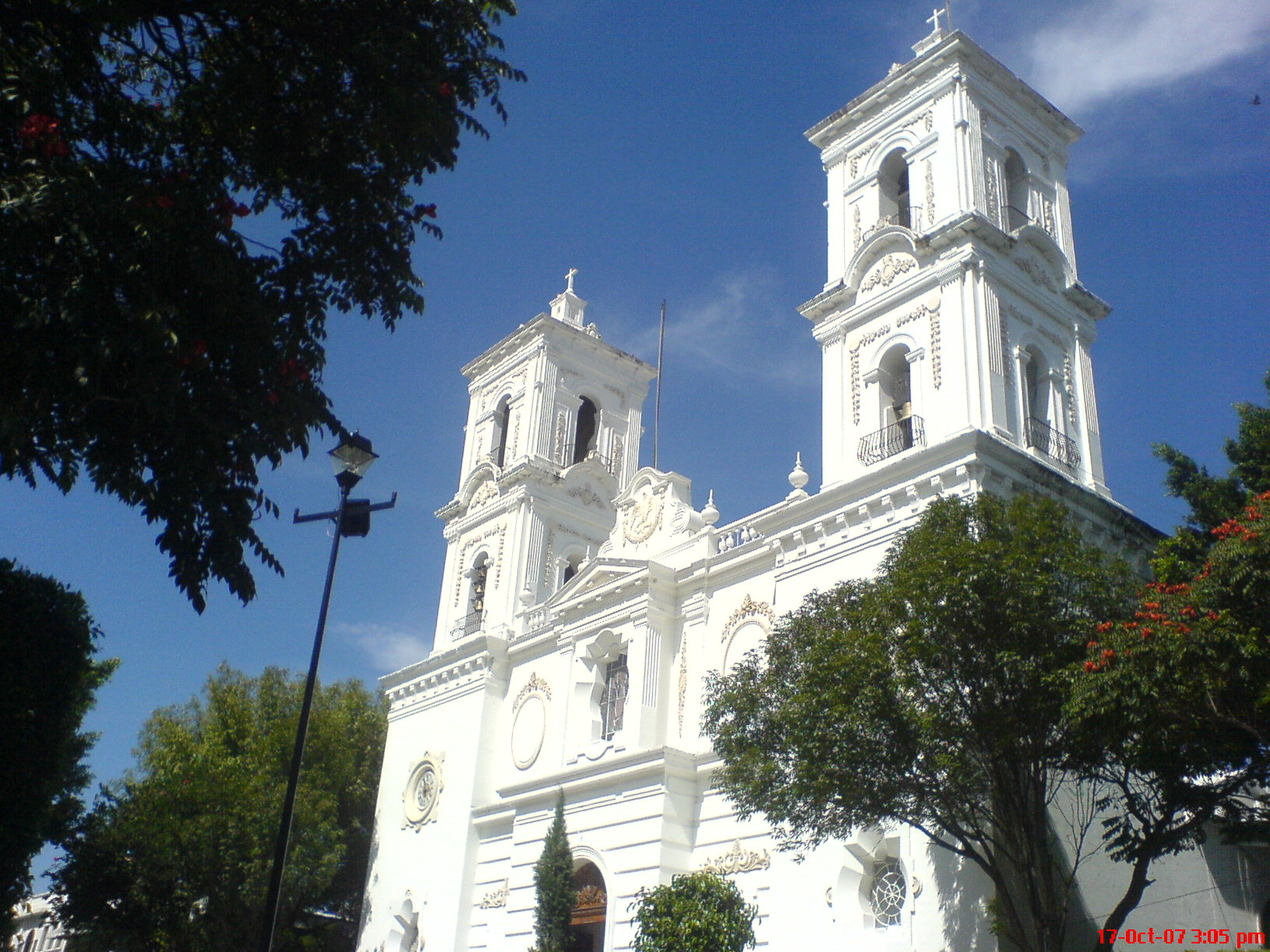
- St. Mary of the Assumption Cathedral
- 17°33′9.5″N 99°30′4.5″W
- Location: Chilpancingo
- Country: Mexico
- Denomination: Roman Catholic Church

History
- Events: Celebration of the First Congress of Anáhuac in 1813

Architecture
- Heritage designation: INAH historical monument I-0011300010
- Architectural type: Latin cross plan
- Style: Neoclassical

Administration
- Diocese: Roman Catholic Diocese of Chilpancingo-Chilapa

The St. Mary of the Assumption Cathedral (also Chilpancingo Cathedral; Spanish: Catedral de Santa María de la Asunción de Chilpancingo) is the main Catholic church of the city of Chilpancingo in Mexico. It is consecrated to the Virgin Mary in its invocation of St. Mary of the Assumption and has been the episcopal seat of the Diocese of Chilpancingo-Chilapa for some years, since it was previously located in the city of Chilapa de Álvarez. It is located in the downtown area within the architectural and historical complex that occupies the First Congress of Anahuac Civic Square. Its construction took place at the end of the 18th century and beginning of the 19th century.

Built in Neoclassical style, it consists of a single nave. The main portal, with two sections and a frontispiece, has wooden panelling. The first section features bossage, without columns, and an arch; the second section features a choir window, framed by two square Tuscan order columns; on the sides are two large medallions. The arches of the second section support a triangular pediment. On top is a frontispiece portraying the eagle of Iturbide's imperial coat of arms.

In this place, on September 13, 1813, General José María Morelos y Pavón established the seat of the First Congress of Anahuac, in which he proclaimed himself Servant of the Nation and where he presented the Act of Independence and the famous document known as the Sentimientos de la Nación ('Feelings of the Nation').

During the earthquake of Saturday, December 10, 2011, the cathedral suffered structural damage.

== See also ==
- Roman Catholicism in Mexico
- St. Mary's Cathedral
