= Antonio Hernández Gallegos =

Mexican Roman Catholic bishop

Antonio Hernández Gallegos (June 4, 1912 − October 22, 1973) was a Mexican Roman Catholic bishop.

Ordained to the priesthood on April 11, 1936, Hernández Gallegos was named bishop of the Roman Catholic Diocese of Tabasco, Mexico in 1967 and died in 1973 while still in office.

== Life ==
He was born in Zacatecas to Don Pablo Hernández and Doña Esther Gallegos. He studied at the Humanistic Seminary of Aguascalientes and was awarded a scholarship at the Pontifical Gregorian University in Rome; he was ordained on April 11, 1936.

He served at the Parish of San José (Aguascalientes), and was the founder and director of the City of Children.

A cause for canonisation was opened in 2005.
