= Roman Catholic Diocese of Tlapa =

Roman Catholic diocese in Mexico

Coordinates: 17.5486°N 98.5817°W

Diocese of Tlapa Dioecesis Tlapensis Diócesis de Tlapa
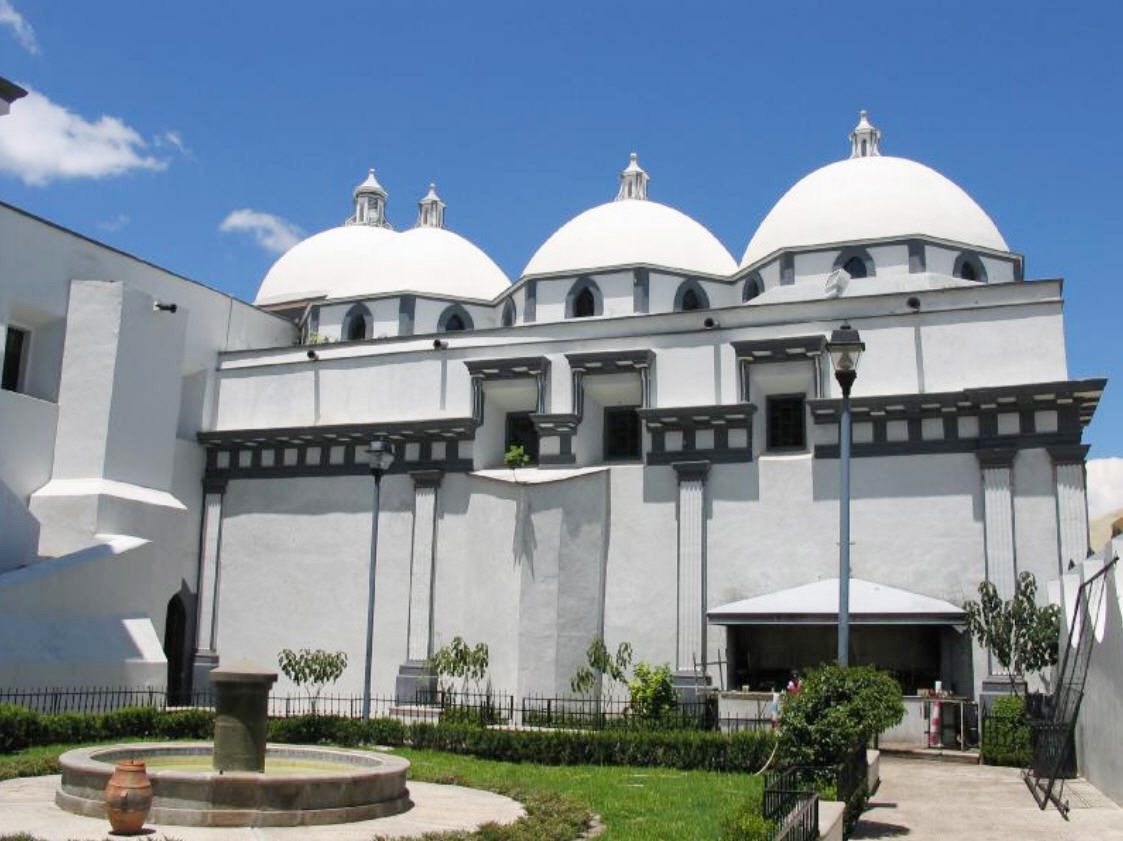
- San Augustin Convent, on the grounds of the Cathedral

Location
- Country: Mexico
- Ecclesiastical province: Province of Acapulco
- Metropolitan: Tlapa de Comonfort, Guerrero

Statistics
- Area: 6,180 sq mi (16,000 km^{2})
- Population: Total; Catholics: (as of 2010); 502,000; 436,000 (86.9%)
- Parishes: 27

Information
- Denomination: Roman Catholic
- Rite: Roman Rite
- Established: 4 January 1992 (34 years ago)
- Cathedral: Cathedral of St. Agustine

Current leadership
- Pope: Leo XIV
- Bishop: Dagoberto Sosa Arriaga

Map

The Roman Catholic Diocese of Tlapa (Latin: Dioecesis Tlapensis) is a suffragan diocese of the Archdiocese of Acapulco.

== Ordinaries ==
- Alejo Zavala Castro (1992 - 2005), appointed Bishop of Chilpancingo-Chilapa, Guerrero
- Oscar Roberto Domínguez Couttolenc, M.G. (2007 - 2012), appointed Bishop of Ecatepec, México
- Dagoberto Sosa Arriaga (2012–present)

== Episcopal see ==
- Tlapa de Comonfort, Guerrero

== External links and references ==
- "Diocese of Tlapa". Catholic-Hierarchy.
