= Francisco María Campos y Ángeles =

- Bishop of Chilapa
- Church: Catholic Church
- Diocese: Diocese of Chilapa
- In office: 12 October 1907 – 5 January 1923
- Predecessor: José Homobono Anaya y Gutiérrez
- Successor: José Guadalupe Ortíz y López
- Other post: Titular Bishop of Doara (1923-1945)
- Previous post: Bishop of Tabasco (1897-1907)

Orders
- Ordination: 23 December 1882
- Consecration: 16 January 1898 by Nicola Averardi

Personal details
- Born: 16 June 1860 Actopan, State of Mexico, United Mexican States
- Died: 29 June 1945 (aged 85)

Francisco María Campos y Ángeles (born 16 June 1860 in Actopan – 29 June 1945) was a Mexican clergyman and bishop for the Roman Catholic Diocese of Chilpancingo-Chilapa, as well as for Roman Catholic Diocese of Tabasco. He became ordained in 1882. He was appointed bishop in 1897. He died on 29 June 1945, at the age of 85.
