= Ambrosio María Serrano y Rodriguez =

Bishop in Mexico

Ambrosio María Serrano y Rodriguez (10 November 1836 – 8 February 1875) was a Mexican clergyman and bishop for the Roman Catholic Diocese of Chilpancingo-Chilapa. He was born in Chilapa. He was ordained in 1863 and appointed bishop in 1864. He died on 8 February 1875, at the age of 38.
