= Manuel Arvizu =

Mexican Bishop

Manuel Arvizu, O.F.M.
- Prelate of Prelature of Jesús María del Naya (Emeritus)
- Church: Roman Catholic Church
- See: Prelature of Jesús María del Naya
- In office: 1962–1992
- Predecessor: none
- Successor: José Antonio Pérez Sánchez
- Previous posts: Auxiliary Bishop of Diocese of Culiacán; Bishop

Orders
- Ordination: 24 June, 1945

Personal details
- Born: April 13, 1919 Etzatlán, Mexico
- Died: November 6, 2009 (aged 90) Tepic, Mexico

Manuel Arvizu O.F.M. (13 April 1919 – 6 November 2009) was a Mexican Bishop of the Roman Catholic Church

Arvizu was born in Etzatlán, Mexico. He was ordained as a priest on 24 June 1945. He was later appointed Prelature of Jesús María del Naya on 24 May 1962, along with Titular Bishop of Dusa. He was ordained a bishop on 15 August 1962. Arvizu resigned as Titular bishop of Dusa in 1978 and resigned from Prelature of Jesús María del Naya on 27 June 1992.
