= Diocese of Tabasco =

Roman Catholic diocese in Mexico

Diocese of Tabasco Dioecesis Tabasquensis Diócesis de Tabasco
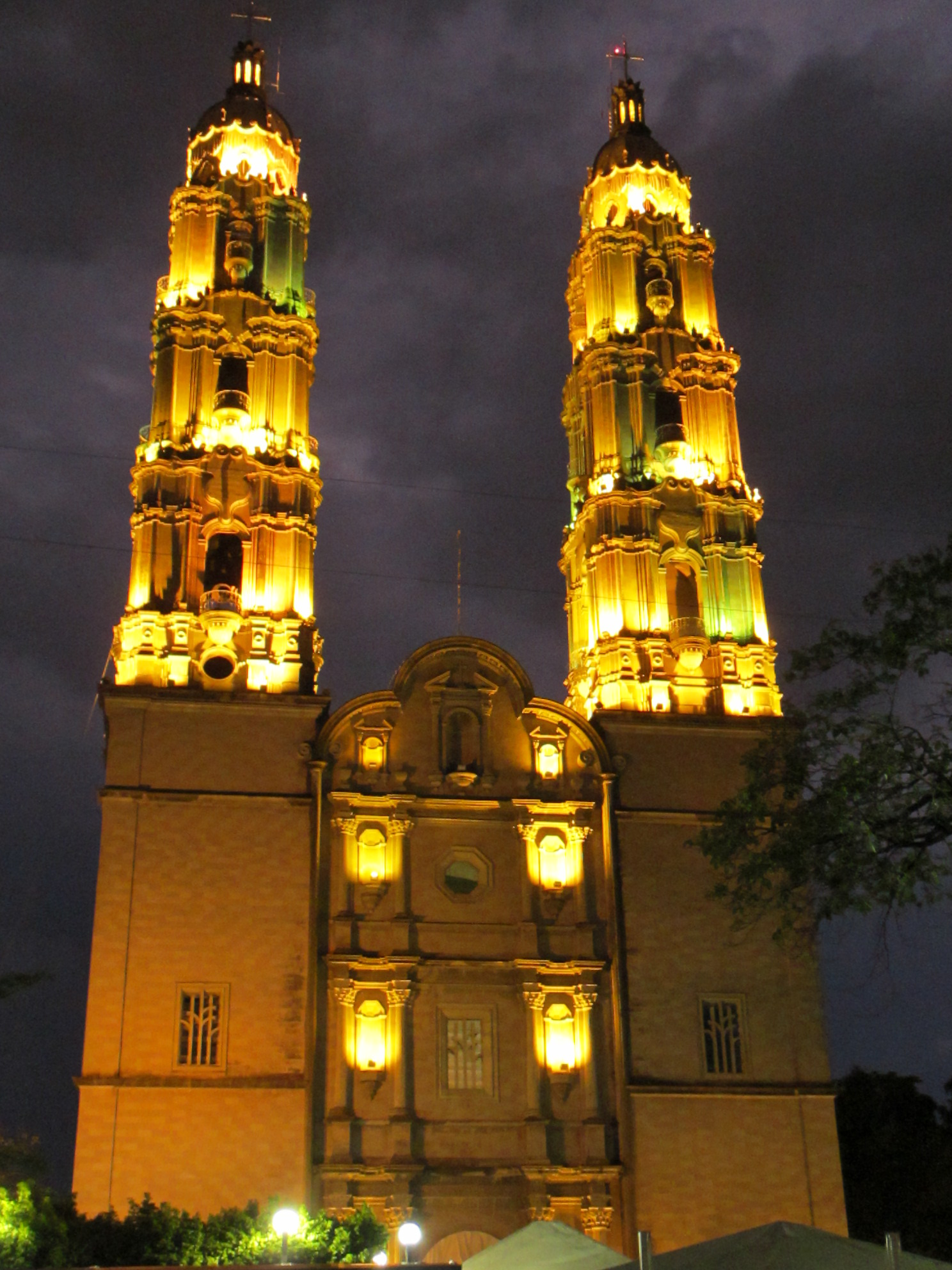
- Catedral del Señor

Location
- Country: Mexico
- Ecclesiastical province: Province of Yucatán
- Metropolitan: Villahermosa, Tabasco

Statistics
- Area: 9,759 sq mi (25,280 km^{2})
- Population: Total; Catholics: (as of 2010); 2,023,000; 1,482,000 (73.3%)
- Parishes: 63

Information
- Denomination: Roman Catholic
- Rite: Roman Rite
- Established: 25 May 1880 (145 years ago)
- Cathedral: Cathedral of the Lord

Current leadership
- Pope: Leo XIV
- Bishop: Gerardo de Jesús Rojas López
- Metropolitan Archbishop: Emilio Carlos Berlie Belaunzarán

Map
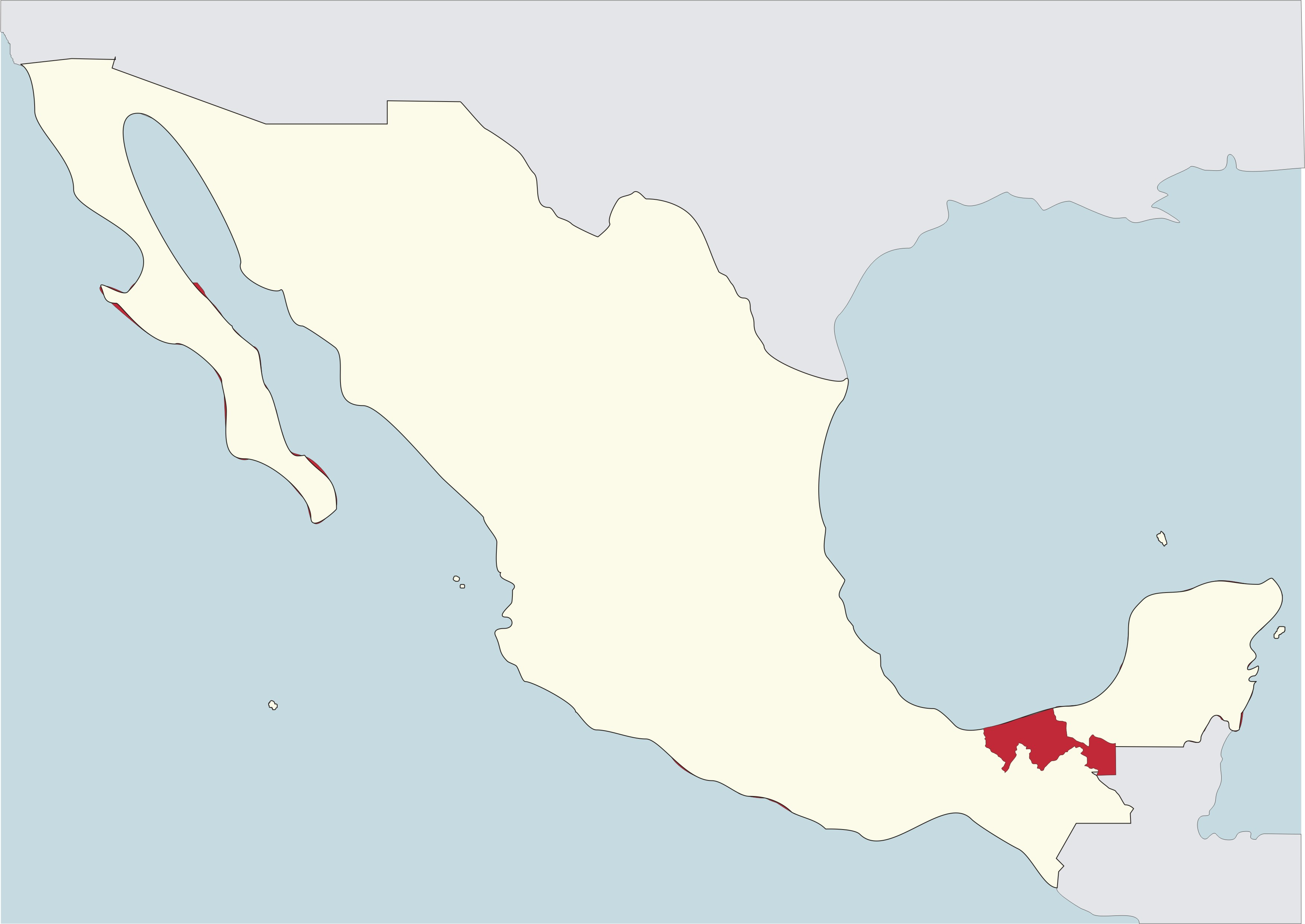

Website
- www.diocesistabasco.org.mx

The Roman Catholic Diocese of Tabasco (Latin: Dioecesis Tabasquensis) (erected 25 May 1880) is a suffragan diocese of the Archdiocese of Yucatán.

== Ordinaries ==
- Agustín de Jesús Torres y Hernandez, C.M. (1881 - 1885)
- Perfecto Amézquita y Gutiérrez, C.M. (1886 - 1896)
- Francisco Maria Campos y Angeles (1897 - 1907)
- Leonardo Castellanos y Castellanos (1908 - 1912)
- Antonio Hernández y Rodríguez (1912 - 1922)
- Pascual Díaz y Barreto, S.J. (1922 - 1929)
- Vicente Camacho y Moya (1930 - 1943)
- José de Jesús Angulo del Valle y Navarro (1945 - 1966)
- Antonio Hernández Gallegos (1967 - 1973)
- Rafael Garcia González (1974 - 1992)
- Florencio Olvera Ochoa (1992 - 2002)
- Benjamín Castillo Plascencia (2003 - 2010)
- Gerardo de Jesús Rojas López (2010 - )

== Episcopal See ==
- Villahermosa, Tabasco

== External links and references ==
- "Diocese of Tabasco". Catholic-Hierarchy.
