= Co-Cathedral of Chilapa =

Co-Cathedral of the Assumption
- Concatedral de la Ascensión
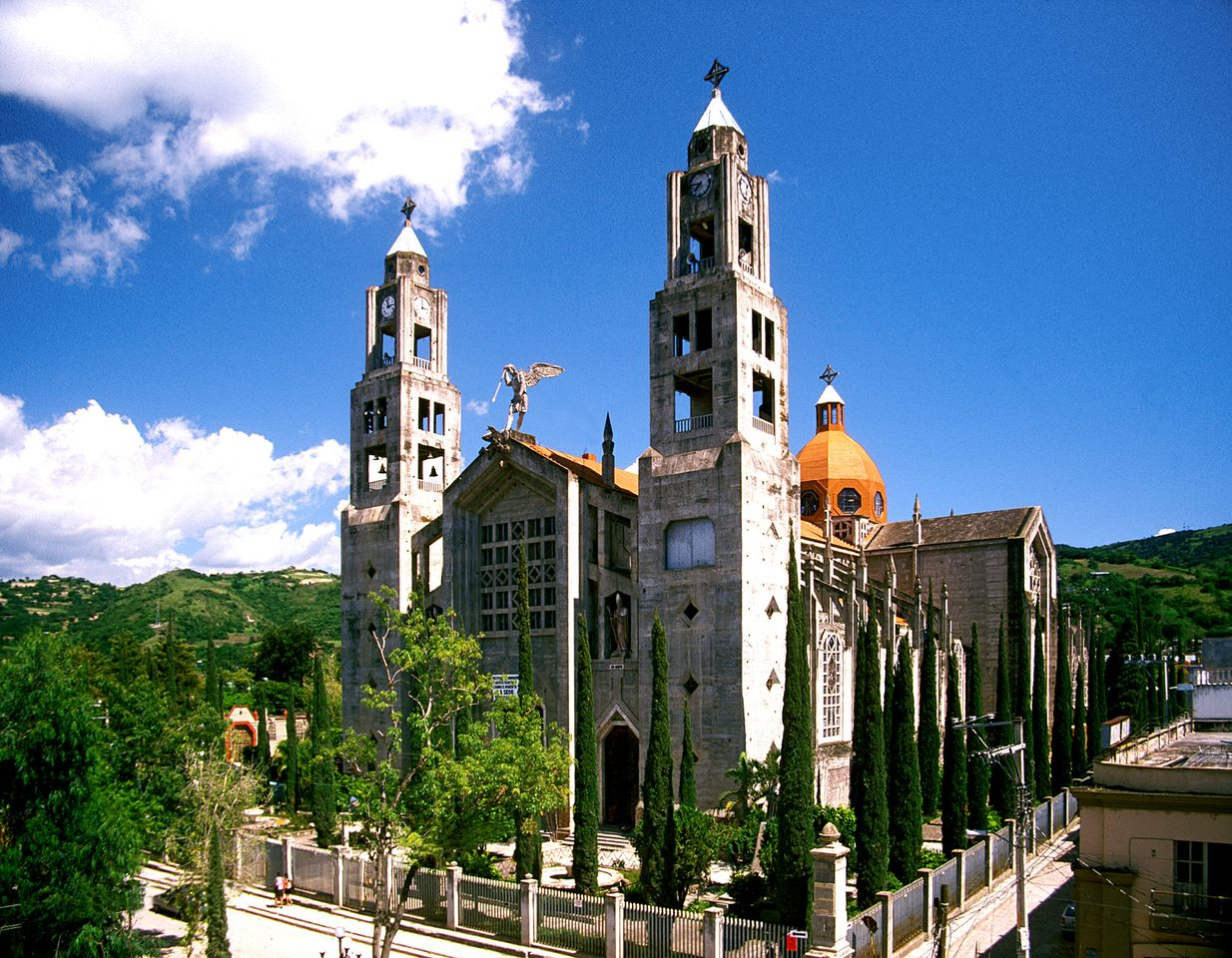
- Co-Cathedral of the Assumption
- 17.5923°N 99.1780°W
- Location: Chilapa
- Country: Mexico
- Denomination: Roman Catholic Church
- Sui iuris church: Latin Church

History
- Status: Co-cathedral
- Founded: 1891
- Dedication: Assumption of Mary

Architecture
- Functional status: Active
- Years built: 1891-1967
- Groundbreaking: 1891
- Completed: 1967

The Co-Cathedral of the Assumption (Spanish: Concatedral de la Ascensión), also known as Chilapa Cathedral, is the main Catholic church in the city of Chilapa in the state of Guerrero, Mexico, and the second in the Diocese of Chilpancingo-Chilapa. It is dedicated to the Virgin of the Assumption.

By orders of Monsignor Ramón Ibarra y González, the construction of the large Chilapa temple was ordered. It was destroyed by a fire in 1930. The then-bishop of Chilapa ordered Federico Mariscal to oversee its reconstruction, who resumed the construction and finished the church.

The cathedral of Chilapa became the fourth most important cathedral in the country.

== See also ==
- Roman Catholicism in Mexico
- Assumption of Mary
