= José Homobono Anaya y Gutiérrez =

Mexican clergyman and bishop

- Bishop of Chilapa
- Church: Catholic Church
- Diocese: Diocese of Chilapa
- In office: 9 November 1902 – 10 December 1906
- Predecessor: José Ramón Ibarra y González
- Successor: Francisco María Campos y Ángeles
- Previous post: Bishop of Sinaloa (1898-1902)

Orders
- Ordination: 3 March 1860
- Consecration: 12 February 1899 by Jacinto López y Romo

Personal details
- Born: 10 November 1836 Pegueros (southwest of Valle de Guadalupe), Jalisco Department, Mexican Republic
- Died: 10 December 1906 (aged 70) Chilapa de Álvarez, Guerrero, Mexico

José Homobono Anaya y Gutiérrez (born 10 November 1836 in Pegueros, Jalisco – died 10 December 1906 in Chilapa de Álvarez, Guerrero) was a Mexican clergyman and bishop for the Diocese of Chilapa, as well as for Diocese of Sinaloa. He became ordained in 1860. He was appointed bishop in 1898. He died in 1906.
