= Alejo Zavala Castro =

Mexican Roman Catholic prelate (1941–2025)

The Most Reverend Alejo Zavala Castro
- Bishop Emeritus of Chilpancingo-Chilapa
- Archdiocese: Acapulco
- Diocese: Chilpancingo-Chilapa
- Appointed: 19 November 2005
- Term ended: 20 June 2015
- Predecessor: Efrén Ramos Salazar
- Successor: Salvador Rangel Mendoza
- Previous post: Bishop of Tlapa (1992–2005)

Orders
- Ordination: 17 December 1966
- Consecration: 25 March 1992 by Girolamo Prigione, Rafael Bello Ruiz, Efrén Ramos Salazar

Personal details
- Born: 31 December 1941 Galeana, Michoacán, Mexico
- Died: 2 November 2025 (aged 83) Morelia, Michoacán, Mexico

Alejo Zavala Castro (31 December 1941 – 2 November 2025) was a Mexican Roman Catholic prelate. He was Bishop of Tlapa from 1992 to 2005 and of Chilpancingo-Chilapa from 2005 to 2015. Zavala Castro died on 2 November 2025 at the age of 83.

Catholic Church titles
Preceded by Efrén Ramos Salazar	Bishop of Chilpancingo-Chilapa; 2005–2015	Succeeded by Salvador Rangel Mendoza
Preceded by Position established	Bishop of Tlapa; 1992–2005	Succeeded by Oscar Roberto Domínguez Couttolenc
