= Leonardo Castellanos y Castellanos =

Venerable Leonardo Castellanos y Castellanos
- Bishop of Tabasco
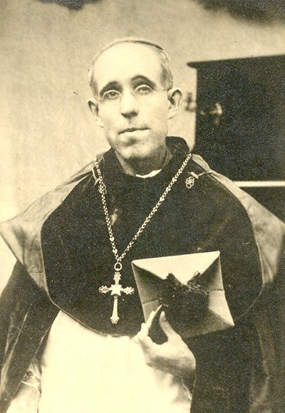
- Leonardo Castellanos y Castellanos, when he was bishop of Roman Catholic Diocese of Tabasco, México (between 1908 and 1912)
- Church: Roman Catholic Church
- Archdiocese: Yucatán
- Diocese: Tabasco
- See: Tabasco
- Appointed: 7 August 1908
- Installed: 5 October 1908
- Term ended: 19 May 1912
- Predecessor: Francisco Maria Campos y Angeles
- Successor: Antonio Hernández y Rodríguez

Orders
- Ordination: 20 March 1886 by José María Cázares y Martínez
- Consecration: 27 September 1908 by Cardinal Giuseppe Ridolfi
- Rank: Bishop

Personal details
- Born: Leonardo Castellanos y Castellanos; 6 November 1862 Ecuandureo, Michoacán de Ocampo, Mexico
- Died: 19 May 1912 (aged 49) Villahermosa, Tabasco

Sainthood
- Feast day: 19 May
- Venerated in: Roman Catholic Church
- Title as Saint: Venerable

Leonardo Castellanos y Castellanos (5 November 1862 in Ecuandureo, Michoacán − 19 May 1912) was a Mexican Roman Catholic bishop.

He was the son of Fernando and Lugarda Castellanos; his mother died when he six years old.

Ordained to the priesthood on 20 March 1886, Castellanos y Castellanos was named as the fourth bishop of the Roman Catholic Diocese of Tabasco, Mexico on 5 October 1908 and died on 19 May 1912 while still in office.

In 1924, the Eucharistic Congress in Mexico City promoted the cause of beatification for the bishop.
