= Diocese of Culiacán =

Roman Catholic diocese in Mexico

Coordinates: 24.8087°N 107.3944°W

Diocese of Culiacán Dioecesis Culiacanensis Diócesis de Culiacán
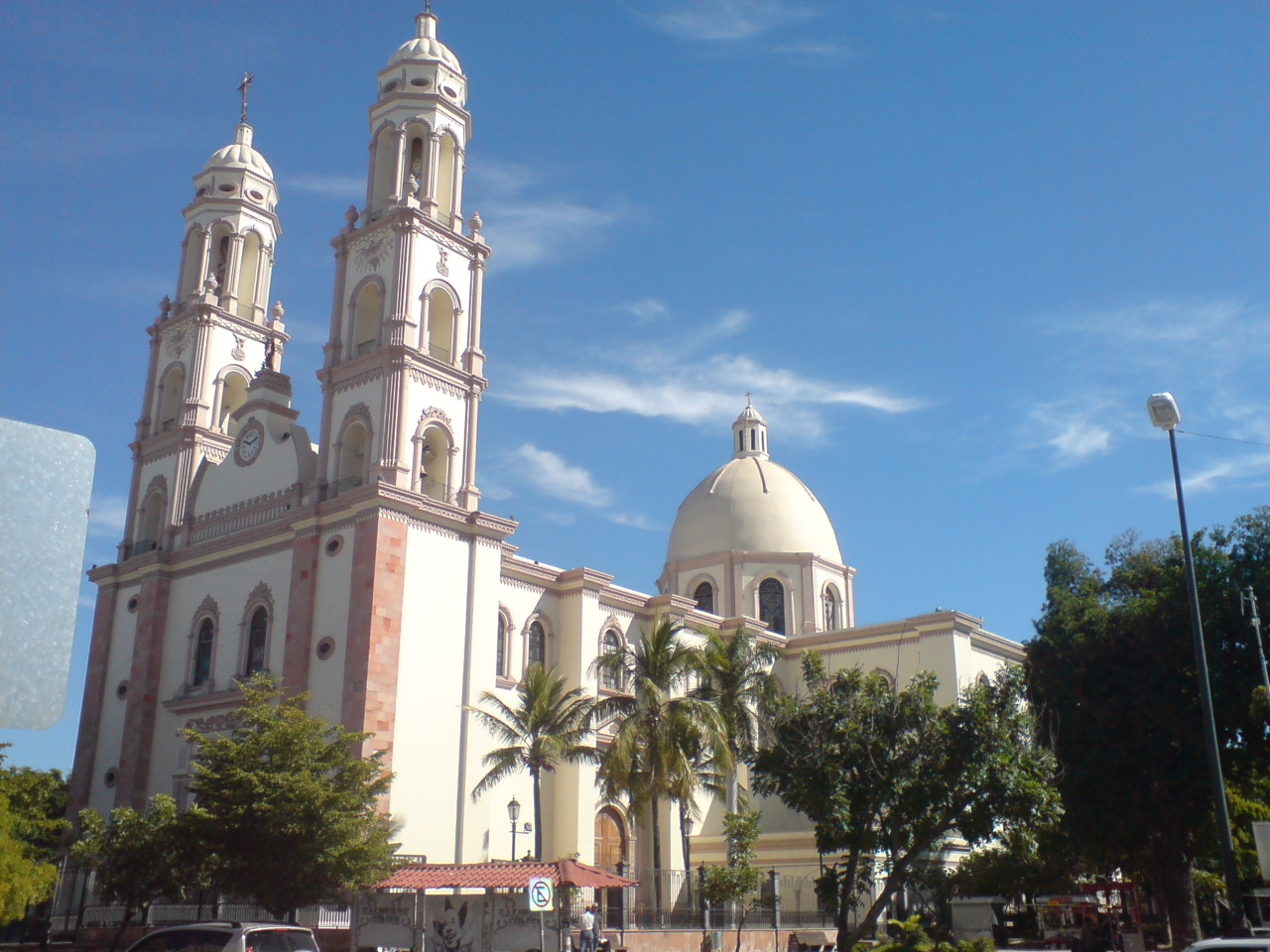
- Catedral Basílica de Nuestra Señora del Rosario

Location
- Country: Mexico
- Ecclesiastical province: Province of Hermosillo
- Metropolitan: Hermosillo

Statistics
- Area: 14,600 sq mi (38,000 km^{2})
- Population: Total; Catholics: (as of 2006); 2,401,453; 2,319,038 (96.6%)
- Parishes: 70

Information
- Denomination: Roman Catholic
- Rite: Roman Rite
- Established: 24 May 1883 (142 years ago)
- Cathedral: Cathedral Basilica of Our Lady of the Rosary

Current leadership
- Pope: Leo XIV
- Bishop: Jesús José Herrera Quiñonez
- Bishops emeritus: Emigdio Duarte Figueroa

Map

Website
- catolicosdeculiacan.com

The Roman Catholic Diocese of Culiacán (Latin: Dioecesis Culiacanensis) is a suffragan diocese of the Archdiocese of Hermosillo.

== Bishops ==
=== Ordinaries ===
- José de Jesús María Uriarte y Pérez (1883 — 1887)
- José María de Jesús Portugal y Serratos, O.F.M. (1888 — 1898), appointed Bishop of Saltillo, Coahuila
- José Homobono Anaya y Gutiérrez (1898 — 1902), appointed Bishop of Chilapa, Guerrero
- Francisco Uranga y Sáenz (1903 — 1919)
- Silviano Carrillo y Cardenas (1920 — 1921)
- Agustín Aguirre y Ramos (1922 — 1942)
- Lino Aguirre Garcia (1944 — 1969)
- Luis Rojas Mena (1969 — 1993)
- Benjamín Jiménez Hernández (1993 — 2011) - Bishop Emeritus
- Jonás Guerrero Corona (2011 — 2023)
- Jesús José Herrera Quiñonez (2023 — )

=== Auxiliary bishops ===
- Luis Rojas Mena (1968–1969), appointed Bishop here
- Jesús Humberto Velázquez Garay (1983–1988), appointed Bishop of Celaya, Guanajuato
- Benjamín Jiménez Hernández (1989–1993), appointed Bishop here
- Emigdio Duarte Figueroa (2007–2010)

=== Other priest of this diocese who became bishop ===
- Jesús María Echavarría y Aguirre, appointed Bishop of Saltillo, Coahuila in 1904

== Episcopal See ==
- Culiacán, Sinaloa

== External links and references ==
- "Diocese of Culiacán". Catholic-Hierarchy.
