= Diocese of Chilpancingo-Chilapa =

Roman Catholic diocese in Mexico

Coordinates: 17.5526°N 99.5013°W

Diocese of Chilpancingo-Chilapa Dioecesis Chilpancingensis-Chilapensis Diócesis de Chilpancingo-Chilapa
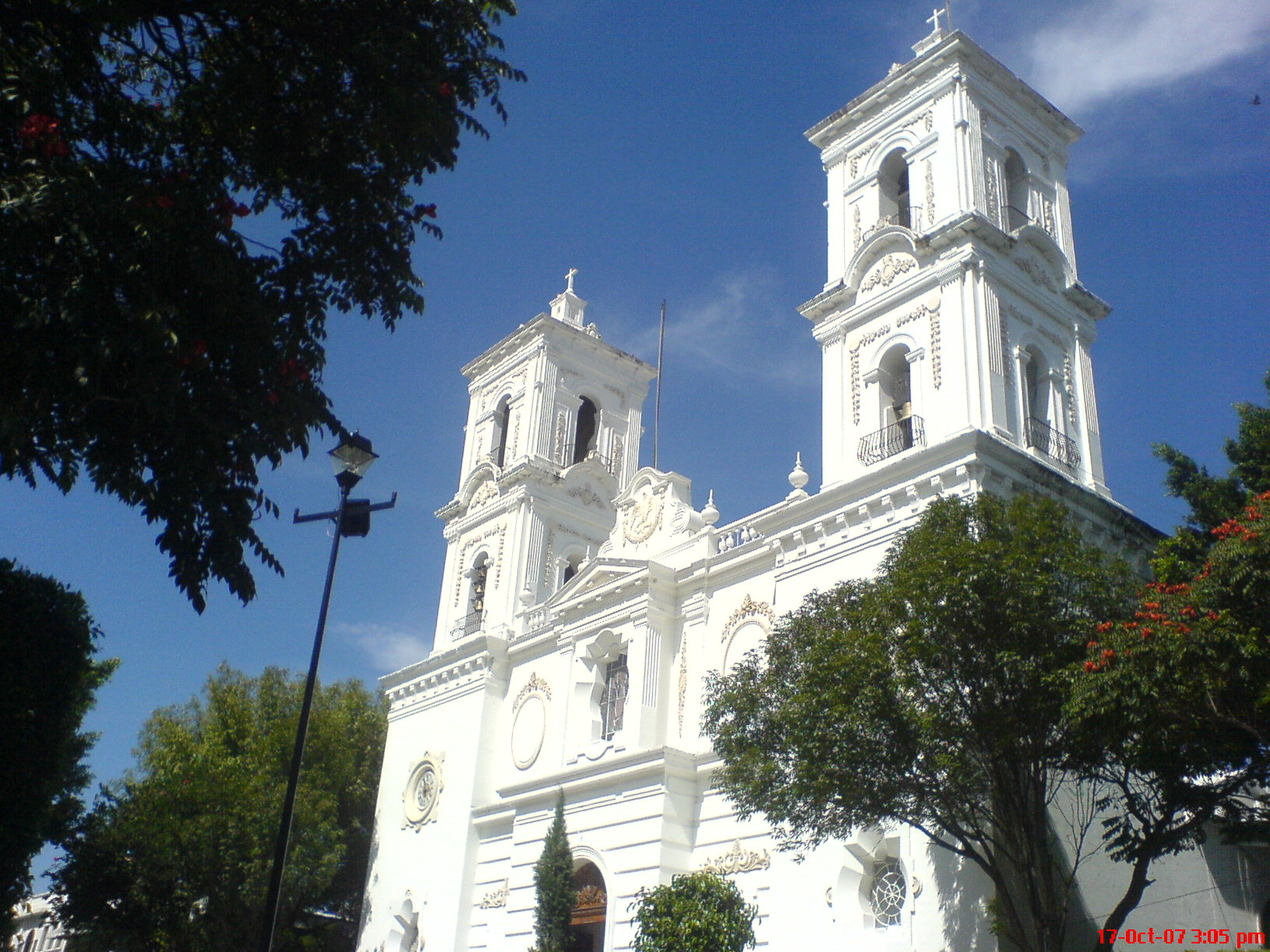
- Catedral de la Ascunsión

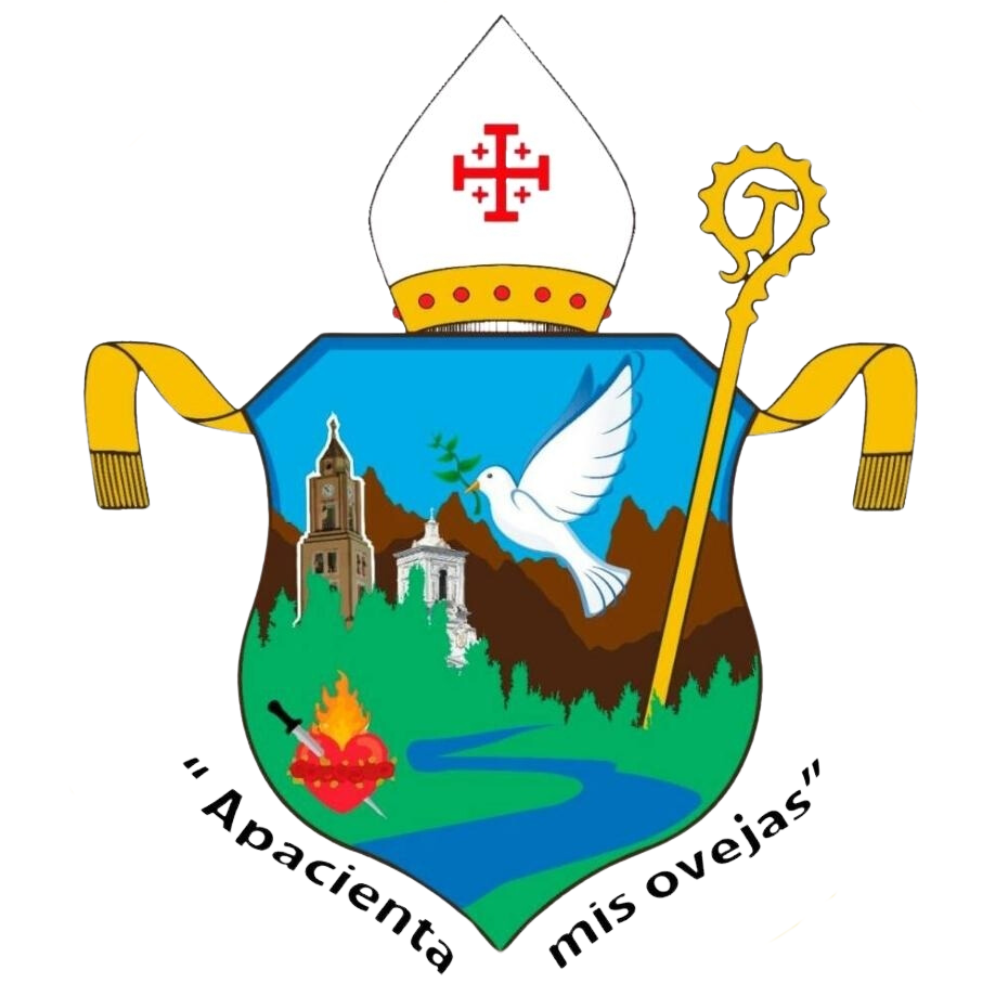
- Coat of arms

Location
- Country: Mexico
- Ecclesiastical province: Province of Acapulco
- Metropolitan: Chilpancingo de los Bravo, Guerrero

Statistics
- Area: 7,713 sq mi (19,980 km^{2})
- Population: Total; Catholics: (as of 2021); 1,600,200; 1,032,881 (64.5%)
- Parishes: 97

Information
- Denomination: Roman Catholic
- Sui iuris church: Latin Church
- Rite: Roman Rite
- Established: 16 March 1863 (163 years ago)
- Cathedral: Cathedral of St. Mary of the Assumption
- Co-cathedral: Co-Cathedral of the Assumption
- Secular priests: 135 (Diocesan); 10 (Religious Orders)

Current leadership
- Pope: Leo XIV
- Bishop: José de Jesús González Hernández
- Bishops emeritus: Salvador Rangel Mendoza

Map
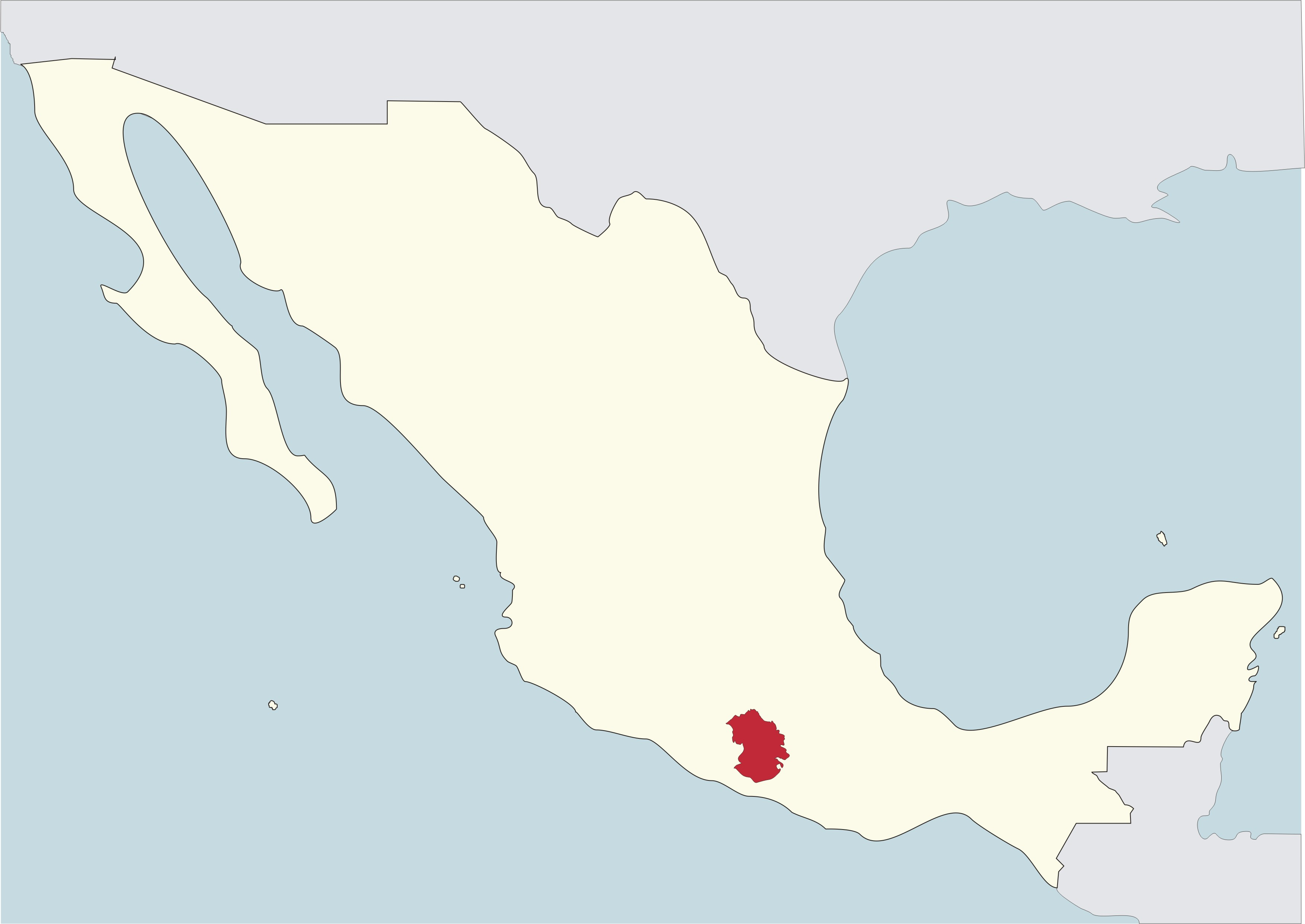

Website
- www.chilpancingochilapa.org/

The Roman Catholic Diocese of Chilpancingo–Chilapa (Latin: Dioecesis Chilpancingensis–Chilapensis) is a suffragan diocese of the Archdiocese of Acapulco.

== History ==
The former Diocese of Chilapa in southern Mexico comprised the State of Guerrero. It was a suffragan of the Archdiocese of Mexico, and existed under that name from 1863 to 1989.

The early bishops were Ambrosia Serrano, Ramon Ibarra, and Homobono Anaya.

John Ssenyondo, a priest in Chilapa, also served under the dictatorship of Idi Amin in his native Uganda. He has been called "The Indiana Jones of the Faith." He was kidnapped and found dead near the town of Ocotlán in 2014.

The current bishop, José de Jesus González, has described the state of Guerrero as "a hijacked state" due to the high levels of organised crime and violence. He told Catholic charity Aid to the Church in Need that in this context the Church is seen as "the only voice that can speak for the people".

The bishop also described his own contact with this violence, namely a situation where his car came under fire from automatic weapons. "There were three of us in a van and they shot at us. They aimed for our heads, not for the tires. But when they saw that we were priests they apologised and offered to pay for the shattered windows." He goes on to explain that the criminals even asked for his blessing, concluding that "they are also my children, even though they are misguided".

== Bishops ==
=== Ordinaries ===
- Ambrosia María Serrano y Rodriguez (1863-1875)
- Tomás Barón y Morales (1876-1882), appointed Bishop of León, Guanajuato
- Buenaventura del Purísimo Corazón de María Portillo y Tejeda (1882-1889), appointed Bishop of Zacatecas
- José Ramón Ibarra y González (1889-1902), appointed Bishop of Tlaxcala (Puebla de los Angeles)
- José Homobono Anaya y Gutiérrez (1902-1906)
- Francisco Maria Campos y Angeles (1907-1923)
- José Guadalupe Ortíz y López (1923-1926), appointed Auxiliary Bishop of Monterrey, Nuevo León
- Leopoldo Díaz y Escudero (1929-1955)
- Alfonso Tóriz Cobián (1956-1958), appointed Bishop of Querétaro
- Fidel Cortés Pérez (1958-1982)
- José María Hernández González (1983-1989), appointed Bishop of Netzahualcóyotl
- Efrén Ramos Salazar (1990-2005)
- Alejo Zavala Castro (2005-2015)
- Salvador Rangel Mendoza (2015-2022)
- José de Jesús González Hernández (2022-present)

=== Coadjutor bishop ===
- Alfonso Tóriz Cobián (1954-1956)

== See also ==
- Chilpancingo
- Chilapa de Álvarez

== External links and references ==
- "Diocese of Chilpancingo-Chilapa". Catholic-Hierarchy.
- "Diocese of Chilpancingo-Chilapa". Página Oficial. Archived from the original on 2010-07-06.
