= Luis Rojas Mena =

- Bishop Emeritus of Diocese of Culiacán
- Church: Roman Catholic Church
- See: Diocese of Culiacán
- In office: 1969–1993
- Predecessor: Lino Aguirre Garcia
- Successor: Benjamín Jiménez Hernández
- Previous post(s): Auxiliary Bishop of Diocese of Culiacán

Orders
- Ordination: March 31, 1945

Personal details
- Born: June 21, 1917; Jalapa de Cánovas, Guanajuato

Luis Rojas Mena (June 21, 1917 – March 18, 2009) was a Mexican Bishop of the Roman Catholic Church.

Rojas Mena was born in Jalpa de Cánovas, Guanajuato, and ordained on March 31, 1945. He was appointed Auxiliary Bishop of the Diocese of Culiacán on May 6, 1968, along with Titular Bishop of Accia, and was ordained a bishop on June 16, 1968. Rojas Mena was appointed as Bishop of Diocese of Culiacán on August 20, 1969, and retired as such on October 4, 1993.

== See also ==
- Diocese of Culiacán
