= José de Jesús González Hernández =

Mexican Roman Catholic bishop

José de Jesús González Hernández O.F.M.
- Bishop of Chilpancingo-Chilapa
- Church: Catholic Church
- Diocese: Diocese of Chilpancingo-Chilapa
- Appointed: 11 February 2022
- Predecessor: Salvador Rangel Mendoza
- Previous post: Prelate of Jesús María (del Nayar) (2010-2022)

Orders
- Ordination: 24 June 1994
- Consecration: 25 May 2010 by Juan Sandoval Íñiguez

Personal details
- Born: 25 December 1964 (age 61) Etzatlán, Jalisco, Mexico

José de Jesús González Hernández (born 25 December 1964) is a Mexican Roman Catholic bishop.

González Hernández was born in Mexico and was ordained to the priesthood in 1994. He served as bishop of the Territorial Prelature of Jesús María del Nayar from 2010 to 2022. In 2022, he was appointed bishop of the Diocese of Chilpancingo-Chilapa.

The current bishop, José de Jesus González, has described the state of Guerrero as "a hijacked state" due to the high levels of organised crime and violence. He told Catholic charity Aid to the Church in Need that in this context the Church is seen as "the only voice that can speak for the people".

The bishop also described his own contact with this violence, namely a situation where his car came under fire from automatic weapons. "There were three of us in a van and they shot at us. They aimed for our heads, not for the tires. But when they saw that we were priests they apologised and offered to pay for the shattered windows." He goes on to explain that the criminals even asked for his blessing, concluding that "they are also my children, even though they are misguided".

In the interview, the bishop said that his exposure to the violence had helped him understand his episcopal ministry. "If He died for the love of me, then I must be willing to die for the love of others. And those ‘others’ include everybody, even the executioners.”
