= Ojo de Agua de Morán =

Town in Jalisco, Mexico with 939 inhabitants

Ojo de Agua de Morán, Jalisco
- Town
- Nickname: Ojo Agua
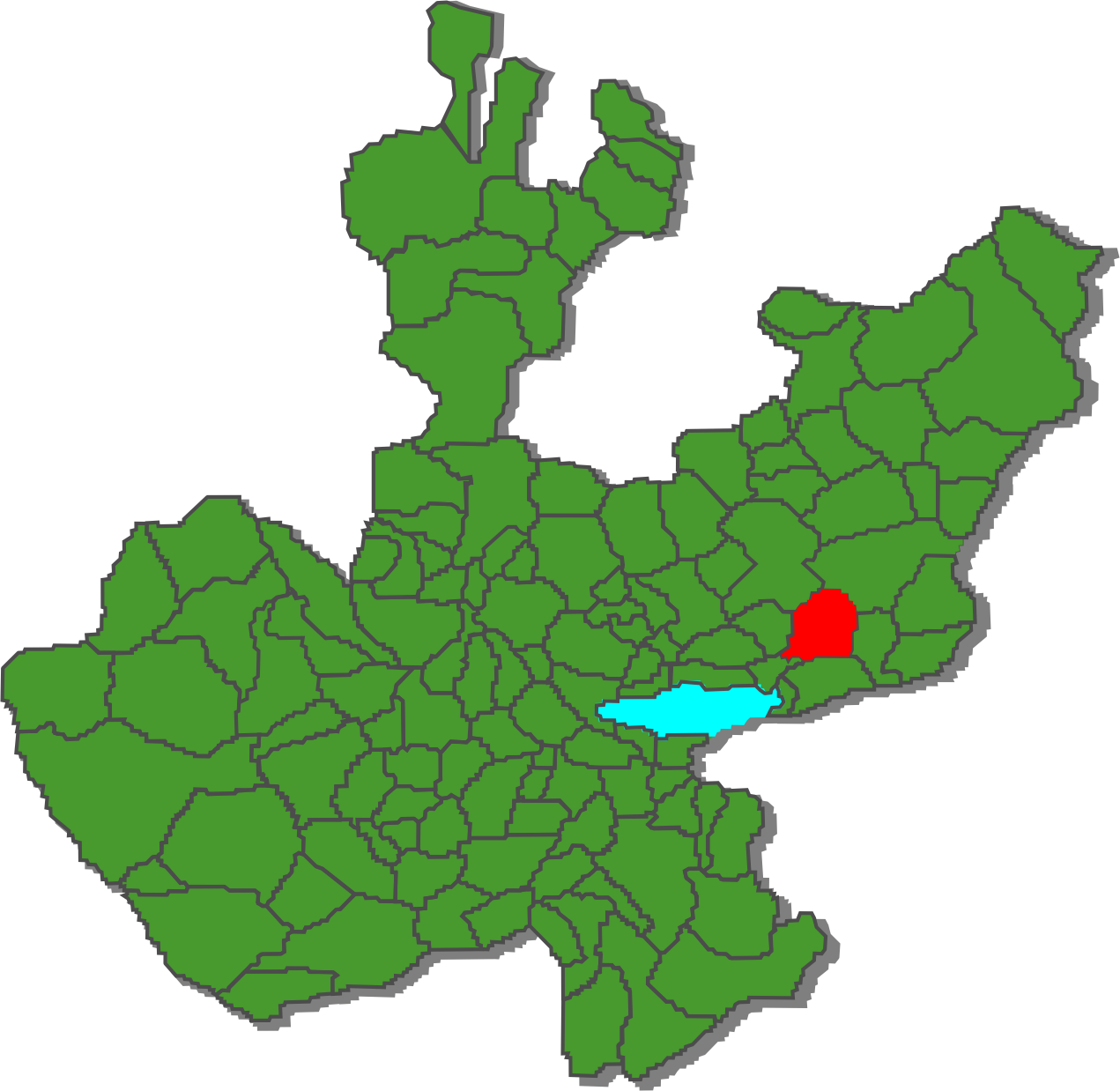
- Location of the municipality in Jalisco

- Location in Mexico
- Coordinates: 20°32′N 102°30′W
- Country: Mexico
- State: Jalisco
- Elevation: 1,980 m (6,500 ft)

Population (2005)
  - Total: 939

Ojo de Agua de Morán is a small rural town located in the municipality of Atotonilco el Alto in the state of Jalisco, Mexico, within the Los Altos de Jalisco region. It lies in the Mexican highlands at an elevation of roughly 1,900–2,000 meters above sea level and has a population of just over one thousand residents. The town is part of a broader agricultural and ranching region known for its strong Catholic traditions, tight-knit family networks, and long-standing cultural identity.

Ojo de Agua de Morán was established during the mid-18th century near a natural water spring (“ojo de agua”) that gave the settlement its name, and it is historically associated with early settler families from the surrounding area. Over time, the community developed around ranching and farming, while in the 20th and 21st centuries many residents migrated to the United States, particularly to cities such as Chicago, California metropolitan areas, and Texas, maintaining strong transnational family and cultural ties to their hometown.

== Meaning of the Name ==
The name “Ojo de Agua” literally means “spring of water” or “water source” in Spanish. Throughout Mexico, settlements called Ojo de Agua were usually founded near natural springs that provided water for farming, ranching, and human settlement.

The addition “de Morán” connects the town to the early founding families, particularly the Morán de Ledesma lineage, descendants of Spanish colonial settlers in western Mexico.

== History of Ojo de Agua de Morán ==
Ojo de Agua de Morán is a rural settlement located in the municipality of Atotonilco el Alto, in the Los Altos region of Jalisco, Mexico. The broader region was originally inhabited by Purépecha and other indigenous groups in the late 1400s, before being incorporated into the expansion of the Purépecha Empire and later the Spanish colonial system following the conquest of western Mexico in 1530 by Nuño de Guzmán.

== 1500s (Pre-colonial and Early Colonial Period) ==
Before Spanish arrival, the region that would become Atotonilco el Alto was influenced by Purépecha expansion from Michoacán. By the early 16th century, it was a frontier zone between indigenous territories. In 1530, Spanish forces under Nuño de Guzmán conquered the region, and it was incorporated into New Spain. Encomiendas were later granted to Spanish settlers, including Martín del Campo and Andrés de Villanueva, and Franciscan missionaries began evangelization.

== 1600s–1700s (Colonial Settlement and Formation) ==
During the colonial period, the area developed into ranching and agricultural lands under the encomienda and hacienda systems. Small rural settlements and water-source communities (ojos de agua) formed around springs used for farming and livestock.

Ojo de Agua de Morán was established in the mid-18th century (around the 1750s) by families associated with the Morán de Ledesma lineage, descendants of Salvador Morán de Ledesma (1630–1718) from Teocaltiche, Jalisco. The settlement developed as a ranching community within the growing rural network of Los Altos de Jalisco.

=== Labor, Hacienda System, and Migration for Work ===
During the colonial and post-colonial periods, many families from Ojo de Agua de Morán and surrounding ranching communities lived and worked near large haciendas in the region. These estates were major centers of agricultural production and labor in Los Altos de Jalisco.

People from the town and nearby settlements often sought employment as laborers (peones) or agricultural workers in haciendas such as:

- Hacienda de La Estanzuela (San Francisco de Asís)
- Hacienda de San Ignacio Cerro Gordo
- Hacienda de La Trasquila

These haciendas provided seasonal and long-term work opportunities in farming, livestock, and land maintenance. Labor migration between small villages and haciendas was a common survival and economic pattern, especially during periods of limited land ownership and rural poverty.

This system shaped settlement patterns in the region, as families moved between small communities like Ojo de Agua de Morán and larger hacienda estates in search of stable work and economic opportunity.

== Geographic Location ==
Ojo de Agua de Morán sits in the highlands region of Jalisco at approximately 1,980 meters (6,496 feet) above sea level. The town lies near several neighboring communities, including:

- San Francisco de Asís
- El Laurel
- Agua Nueva
- El Destierro
- Los Adobes
- Unión de Guadalupe
- La Purísima

== Colonial Families and Genealogy ==
Ojo de Agua de Morán attracts genealogical interest because many local families are believed through local tradition and regional parish records to descend from early colonial settlers of the Los Altos de Jalisco region. These lineages formed part of the broader Spanish colonial population that expanded throughout western New Spain during the 17th and 18th centuries. Families historically associated with the area include:

- Morán de Ledesma (Teocaltiche)
- De Villalobos (Teocaltiche / Encarnación de Díaz)
- Ascencio de León (Arandas)
- Hernández Gamiño (La Soledad / Arandas region)
- Camarena (Arandas)
- Martín del Campo (San Juan de los Lagos)
- Rodríguez de Portugal (Poncitlán)
- De la Torre (San Juan de los Lagos)
- Vázquez de Zermeño (San Miguel el Alto)
- Romo de Vivar (Jalostotitlán)
- Macías Valadez (Aguascalientes)
- Guzmán de Quesada (Ayotlán)
- González de Hermosillo (Jalostotitlán)
