= Luis María Martínez =

Mexican Catholic archbishop (1881–1956)

His Excellency Luis María Martínez
- Archbishop of Mexico
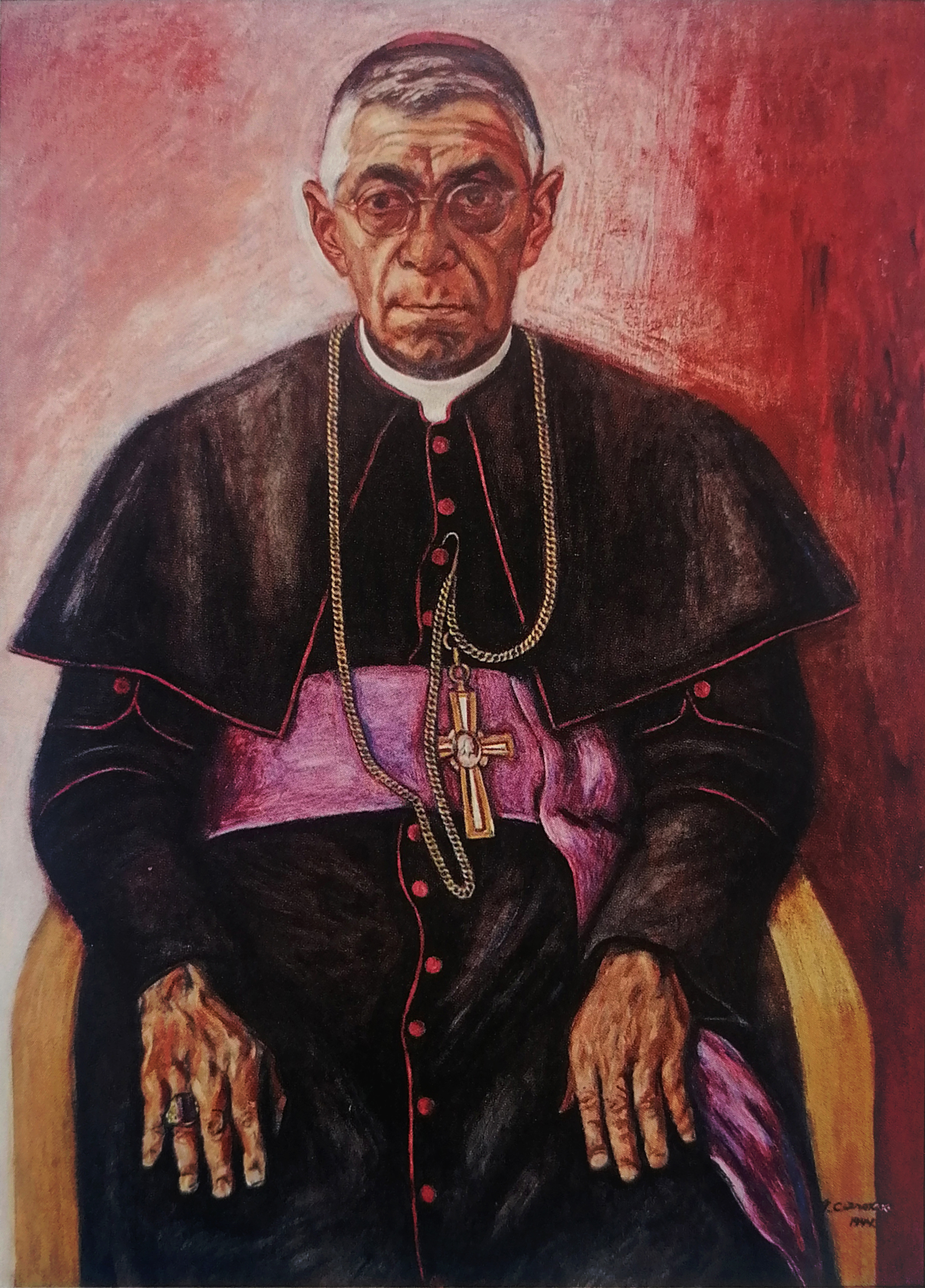
- Portrait by José Clemente Orozco, before 1950
- See: Mexico City, Mexico
- Installed: 20 February 1937
- Term ended: 9 February 1956
- Predecessor: Pascual Díaz y Barreto
- Successor: Miguel Darío Miranda y Gómez

Orders
- Ordination: 20 November 1904
- Consecration: 30 September 1923 by Leopoldo Ruiz y Flores

Personal details
- Born: Luis María Martínez y Rodríguez; 9 June 1881 Michoacán, Mexico
- Died: 9 February 1956 (aged 74) Mexico City, Mexico
- Denomination: Roman Catholic Church

Luis María Martínez y Rodríguez (9 June 1881 – 9 February 1956) was a Mexican Catholic cleric who served as the archbishop of Mexico and the first official Primate of Mexico. He was also a scholar and poet, and a member of the Academia Mexicana de la Lengua.

== Early life and career ==
Luis María Martínez y Rodríguez was born on June 9, 1881, in Molino de Caballeros in Michoacán. He studied at the seminary in the diocese of Morelia, and was ordained on 30 November 1904.

He became a teacher at the seminary, ultimately rising to the position of dean. In 1923, he was named as auxiliary bishop to the archbishop of Morelia as well as the titular bishop of Anemurium. Eleven years later he was elevated to coadjutor bishop of Morelia and titular archbishop of Misthia.

== Archbishopric ==
Pope Pius XI appointed Martínez as Archbishop of Mexico City in February 1937, following the death of Archbishop Pascual Díaz y Barreto.

Martínez was a close friend of Mexican President Lázaro Cárdenas, dating back to their youth in Michoacán. The good working relationship of both men during the Cárdenas administration (1934–1940) bridged a gap between church and state, and helped subdue the bitter animosity between Catholics and leftists that had lingered since the Mexican Revolution. The archbishop kept his friendly, pro-government stance through the succeeding administrations of Manuel Ávila Camacho, Miguel Alemán Valdés, and Adolfo Ruiz Cortines.

He maintained a steady belief in democracy and publicly urged citizens to vote. During World War II, he spoke out strongly against fascism and groups that sought to align Mexico with the Axis powers. As described in an obituary, "his adherence to the democratic cause was the more notable in those days in that some of the more strident pro-Axis groups were largely Catholic in composition".

In 1951, Martínez received the honorific title of Primate of Mexico, the first such officeholder in the church.

A philosopher of the Scholastic tradition, his focus on the ultimate nature of things led him to theology. He was also a writer of spiritual poetry. While his traditional values provoked criticisms of some aspects of Mexico's modernization, he always retained a special relationship with the people. He presided over the celebration of the 50th anniversary of the coronation of Our Lady of Guadalupe, declaring, "I am Zumárraga" to draw Mexicans who have "wandered" back to the church. He joined the Academy in 1953, and many of his sermons were translated into French, Italian, and German.

In 1954, he blessed the Crypt of the Archbishops, which he commissioned, in the Mexico City Metropolitan Cathedral.

He died on 9 February 1956 in Mexico City. He was interred beneath the main altar of Mexico City's Metropolitan Cathedral after a pontifical High Mass celebrated by the Archbishop of Yucatán, Fernando Ruiz y Solózarno, and attended by more than 800 church officials. Police officials estimated that over 100,000 mourners had filed past the funeral bier prior to the Mass. On 12 May 2011, his remains were exhumed for his cause for canonization.
