= Vicente Camacho y Moya =

Mexican Roman Catholic bishop (1886–1943)

Vicente María Camacho y Moya (June 8, 1886 − February 18, 1943) was a Mexican Roman Catholic bishop.

Moya was ordained to the priesthood on December 5, 1909, and in 1930 was named bishop of the Roman Catholic Diocese of Tabasco, Mexico.

He died in 1943 while still in office.
