= José de Jesús Angulo del Valle y Navarro =

José de Jesús Angulo del Valle y Navarro (June 24, 1888 − September 19, 1966) was a Mexican Roman Catholic bishop.

Ordained to the priesthood in November 19, 1916, Angulo del Valle y Navarro was named bishop of the Roman Catholic Diocese of Tabasco, Mexico in 1945 and died in 1966 while still in office.
