= Chihuahua Municipality =

Municipality in the Mexican state of Chihuahua

Chihuahua
- Municipality
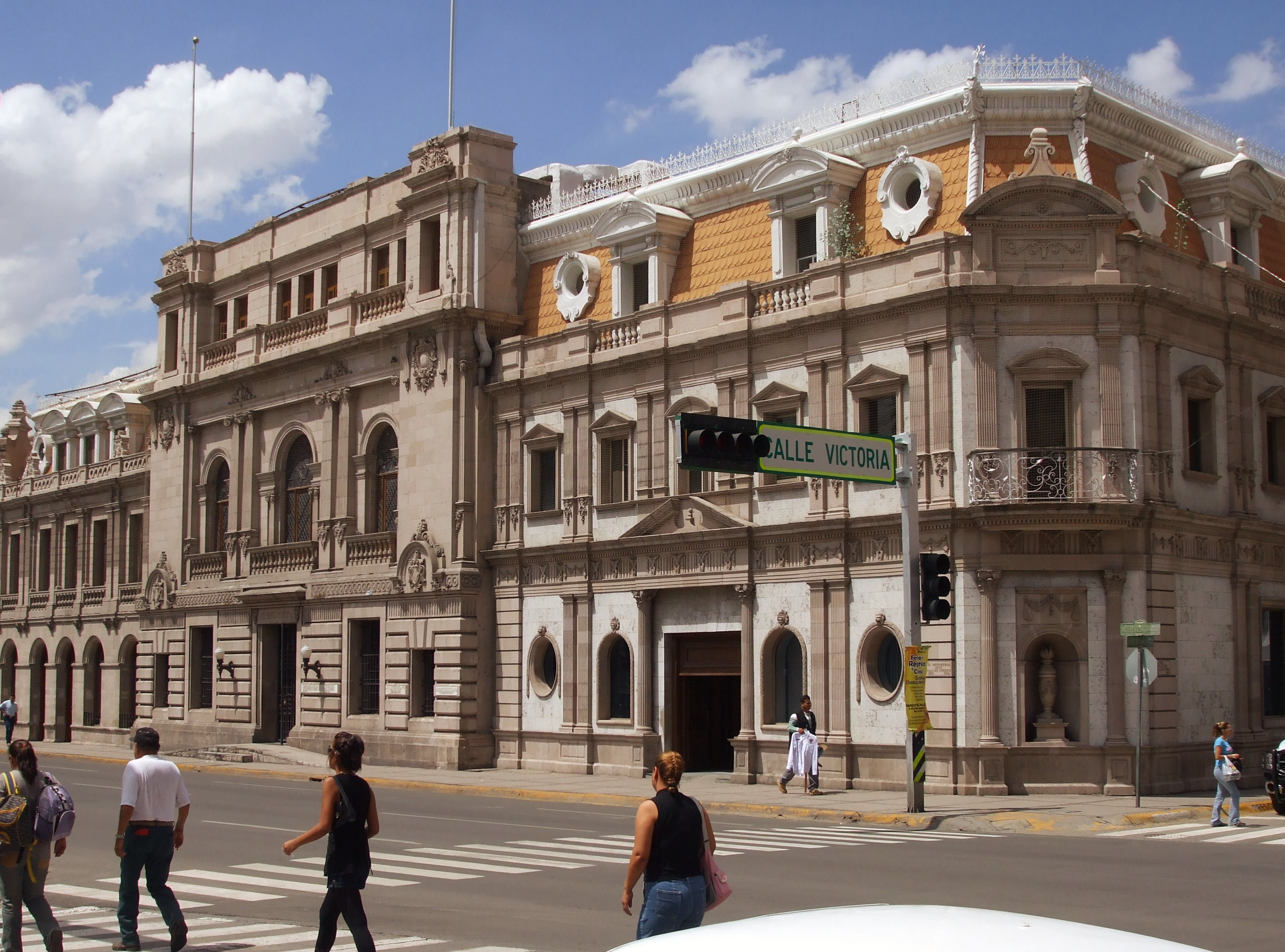
- City Hall of Chihuahua

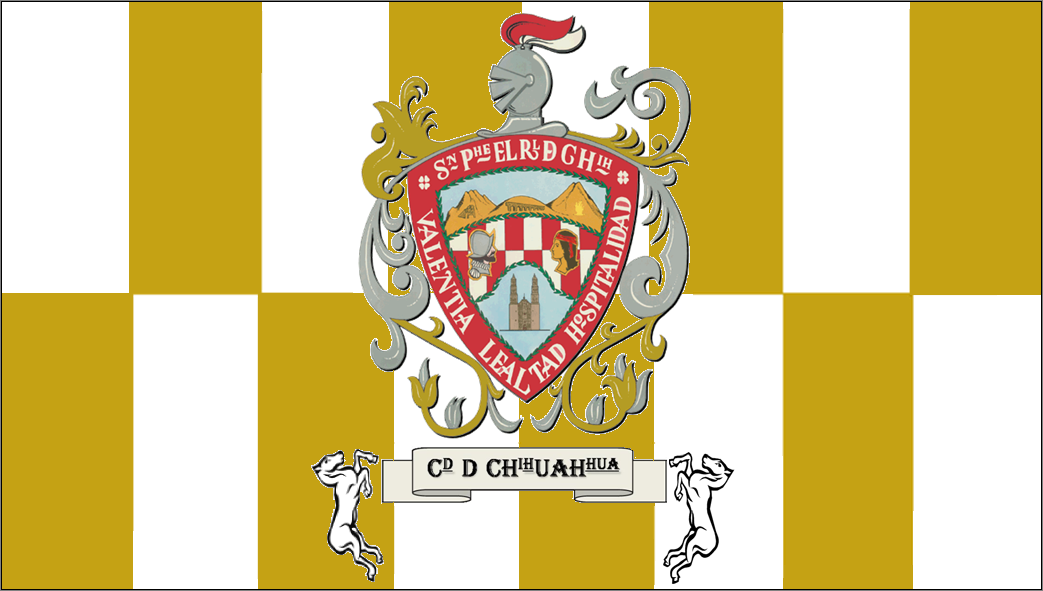
- Flag Coat of arms

- Municipality of Chihuahua
- Coordinates: 28°38′07″N 106°05′20″W
- Country: Mexico
- State: Chihuahua
- Municipal seat: Chihuahua, Chih.
- Municipality created: 7 August 1821

Government
  - Mayor of Chihuahua: Marco Antonio Bonilla (PAN)

Area
  - Total: 9,219.30 km^{2} (3,559.59 sq mi)
- Elevation: 1,440 m (4,720 ft)

Population (2010)
  - Total: 819,543
- Postal code: 31000
- Area code: 614
- Website: www.municipiochihuahua.gob.mx

Chihuahua is one of the 67 municipalities of Chihuahua, in northern Mexico. The municipal seat is the city of Chihuahua, which is also the capital of the state of Chihuahua.

As of 2010, the municipality had a total population of 937, 674, up from 819,543 in 2010. It covers an area of 9,219.30 km^{2}.

As of 2020, the city of Chihuahua had a population of 925, 762, up from 809,232 in 2020. Other than the city of Chihuahua, the municipality had 888 localities, the largest of which was El Sauz (2010 population: 1,474), classified as rural.

== Geography ==
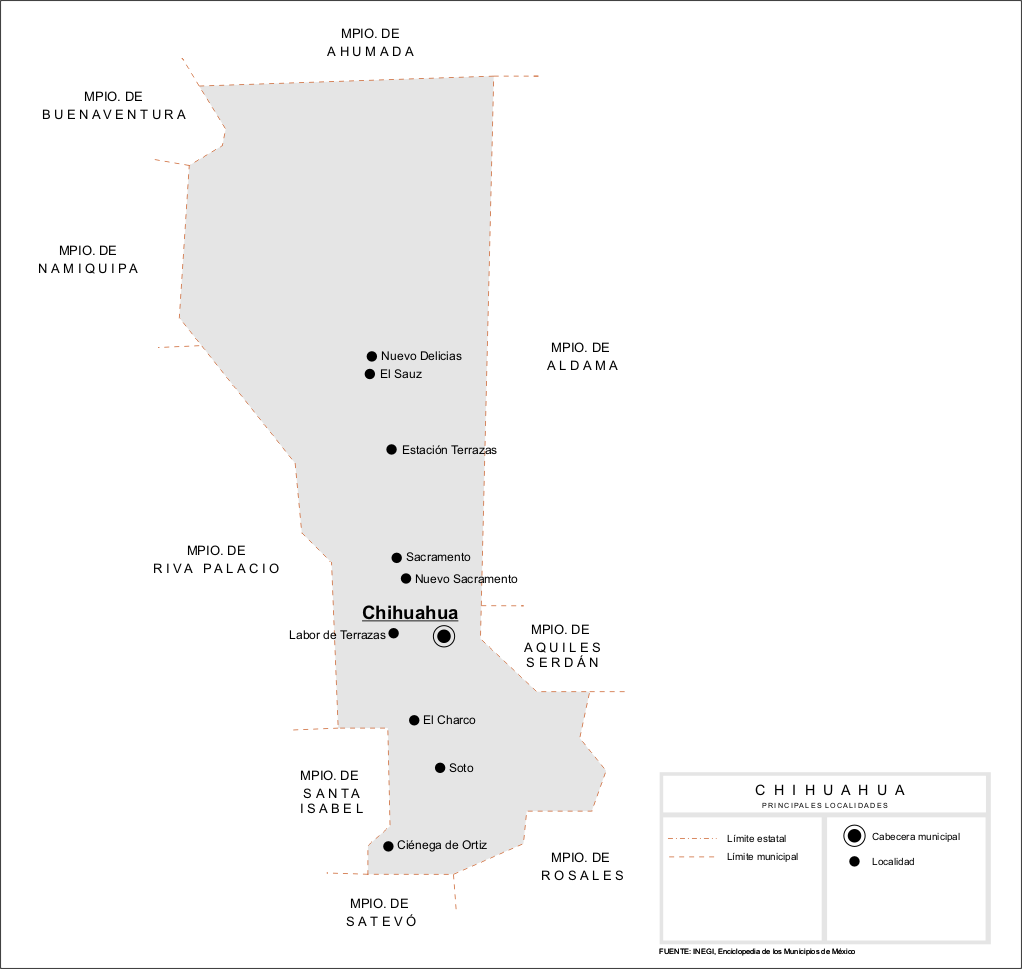
Principal locations in Chihuahua Municipality.

The municipality includes 888 localities, with the principal ones being:

Locality	Population
Total of Municipality	937 674
Chihuahua	925 762
El Sauz	1 474
San Isidro (Los Hoyos)	931
Nuevo Delicias	708
Nuevo Sacramento	462
Estación Terrazas	445
El Charco	340
La Casita	318
Rancho de Enmedio (Estación Müller)	213
El Vallecillo	213
Sacramento	244
Colonia Soto	129
Colonia Ocampo	106
El Pueblo De Guadalupe	250
