= Symbols of Chihuahua City =

The flag of Chihuahua City, Mexico was adopted as a symbol of the city on 2007.

== Coat of arms ==
Coat of arms of Chihuahua.

The coat of arms of Chihuahua City is of the Gothic ogival type, that is, ending in a point. (This is unusual among the shields of Mexico, which follow the Spanish heraldic tradition). It is said that its shape is due to the fact that the creator was a French citizen living in the Chihuahua City.

=== History ===
In October 2005, the Chihuahua city council proposed legislating the symbols of the municipality; The municipal shield being an adaptation of the state shield.

== Flag ==
Chihuahua City
- Chihuahua City
- Use: Civil flag, civil and state ensign
- Proportion: 3:2
- Adopted: 2007

It is formed of a rectangle divided into sixteen vertical rectangles in identical measurements, interspersed or checkered in the following order starting from the flagpole: White and gold at the top for the first eight, and at the bottom for the remaining eight, starting with gold to conclude with white, with the coat of arms of San Felipe el Real de Chihuahua appearing in the center of the flag. It was adopted in 2007.. In the center is the coat of arms of the city.

=== History ===
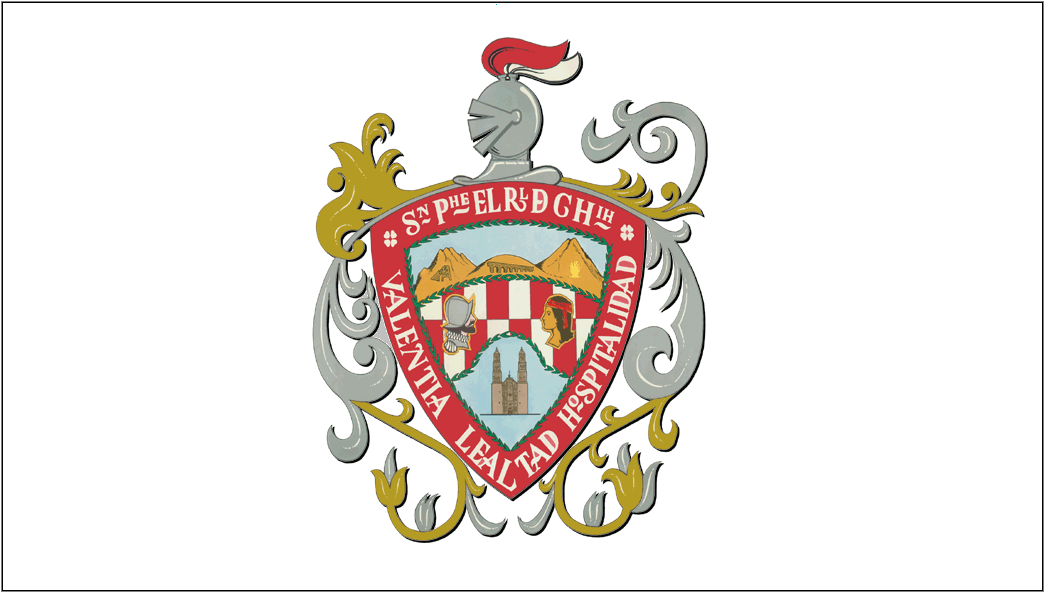
Flag of Chihuahua City (1946–2001)

Flag of Chihuahua City (2002–2006)

Flag of Chihuahua City (2006–2007)

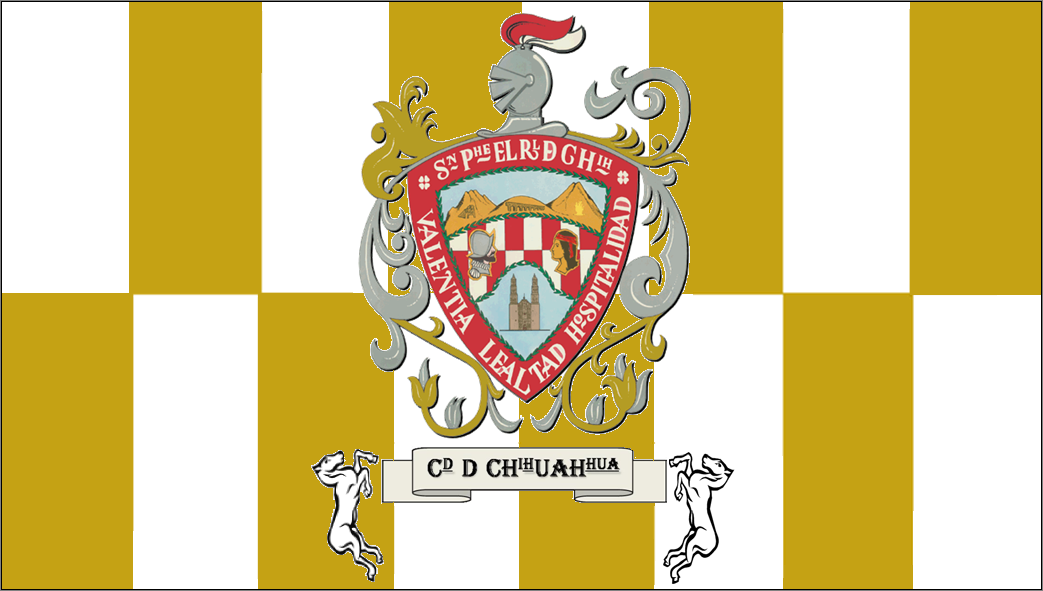
Flag of Chihuahua City

== See also ==
- List of Mexican municipal flags
- Chihuahua City
