= Chihuahua City =

Chihuahua Ją’éłąyá (Lipan Apache) Chihuahua City Ciudad de Chihuahua
- City
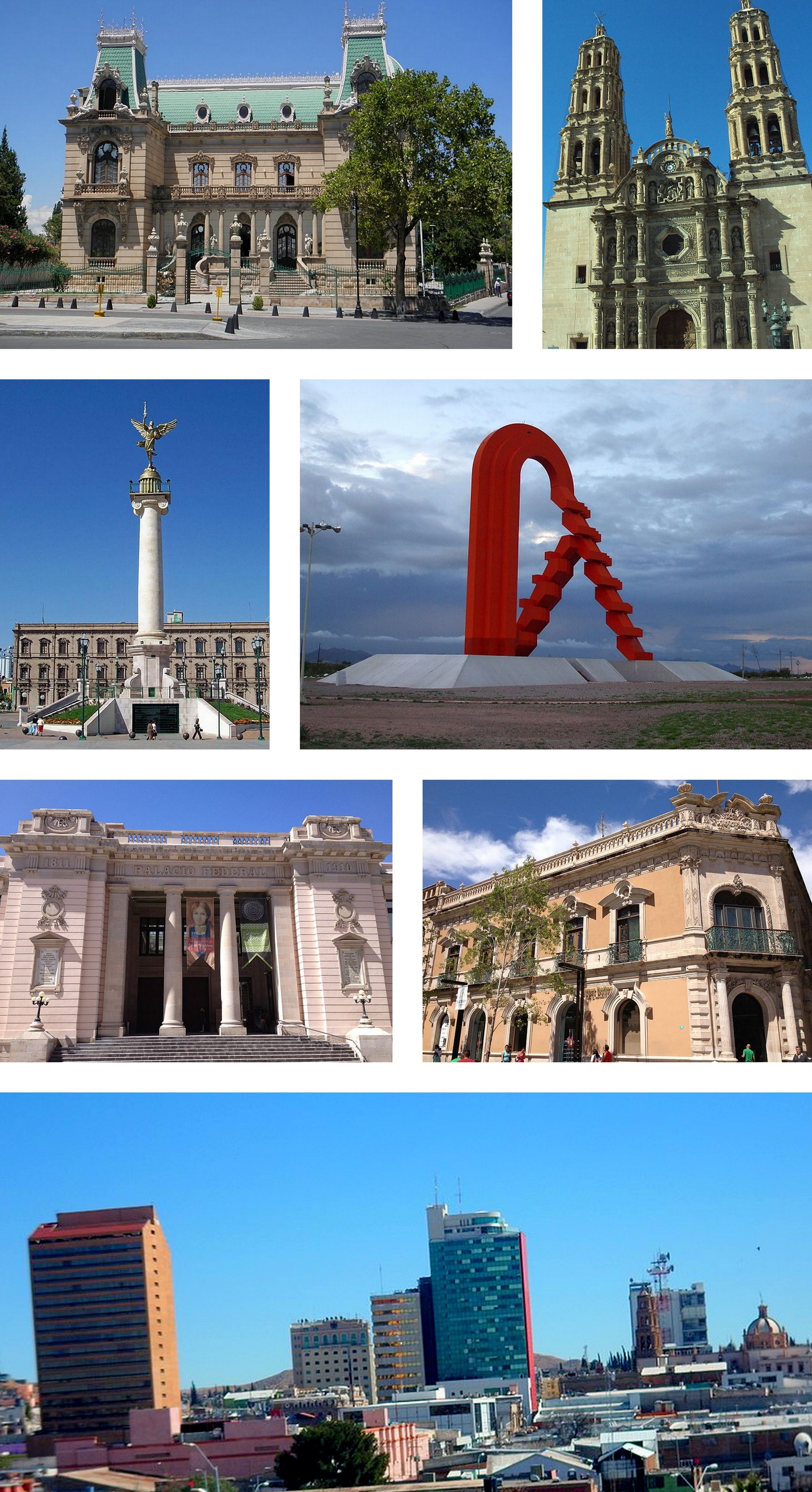
- From the top to the left: Quinta Gameros, Cathedral of Chihuahua, Angel of Liberty, Puerta de Chihuahua, Federal Palace, Creel House, and skyline of El Palomar Park.

- Flag Seal
- Motto: Valentía, Lealtad, Hospitalidad (Courage, Loyalty, Hospitality)
- Location in the state of Chihuahua

- Location in Mexico
- Coordinates: 28°38′13″N 106°04′37″W
- Country: Mexico
- State: Chihuahua
- Municipality: Chihuahua
- Founded: October 12, 1709
- Founder: Antonio de Deza y Ulloa

Government
  - Alcalde: Marco Bonilla Mendoza (PAN)

Area
  - City: 259 km^{2} (100 sq mi)
- Elevation: 1,415 m (4,642 ft)

Population (2020)
  - City: 925,762
  - Rank: 11th in Mexico
  - Density: 3,570/km^{2} (9,260/sq mi)
  - Metro: 988,065
- Demonym: Chihuahuense

GDP (PPP, constant 2015 values)
  - Year: 2023
  - Total: $31.5 billion
  - Per capita: $28,200
- Time zone: UTC−06:00 (Zona Centro)
- ZIP codes: 31000
- Area code: +52 614
- Climate: BSh
- Website: City of Chihuahua

The city of Chihuahua or Chihuahua City (Spanish: Ciudad de Chihuahua [sjuˈða(ð) ðe tʃiˈwawa]; Lipan: Ją’éłąyá) is the state capital of the Mexican state of Chihuahua. As of 2020, the city of Chihuahua had a population of 925,762 inhabitants, while the metropolitan area had a population of 988,065 inhabitants.

Among cities in Mexico, the city of Chihuahua is highly ranked in human and social development. According to a UNDP report on human development, Chihuahua municipality's HDI is 0.842 as of 2020 – among the highest in the country, only after municipalities in the Monterrey and Mexico City areas. IMCO ranks Chihuahua as one of the six cities with very high urban competitiveness The city was named capital of Mexico for a brief amount of time in 1864 by Benito Juarez during the Second French intervention in Mexico.

The predominant activity is industry, including domestic heavy, light industries, consumer goods production, and to a smaller extent maquiladoras. The city is served by General Roberto Fierro Villalobos International Airport.

== History ==
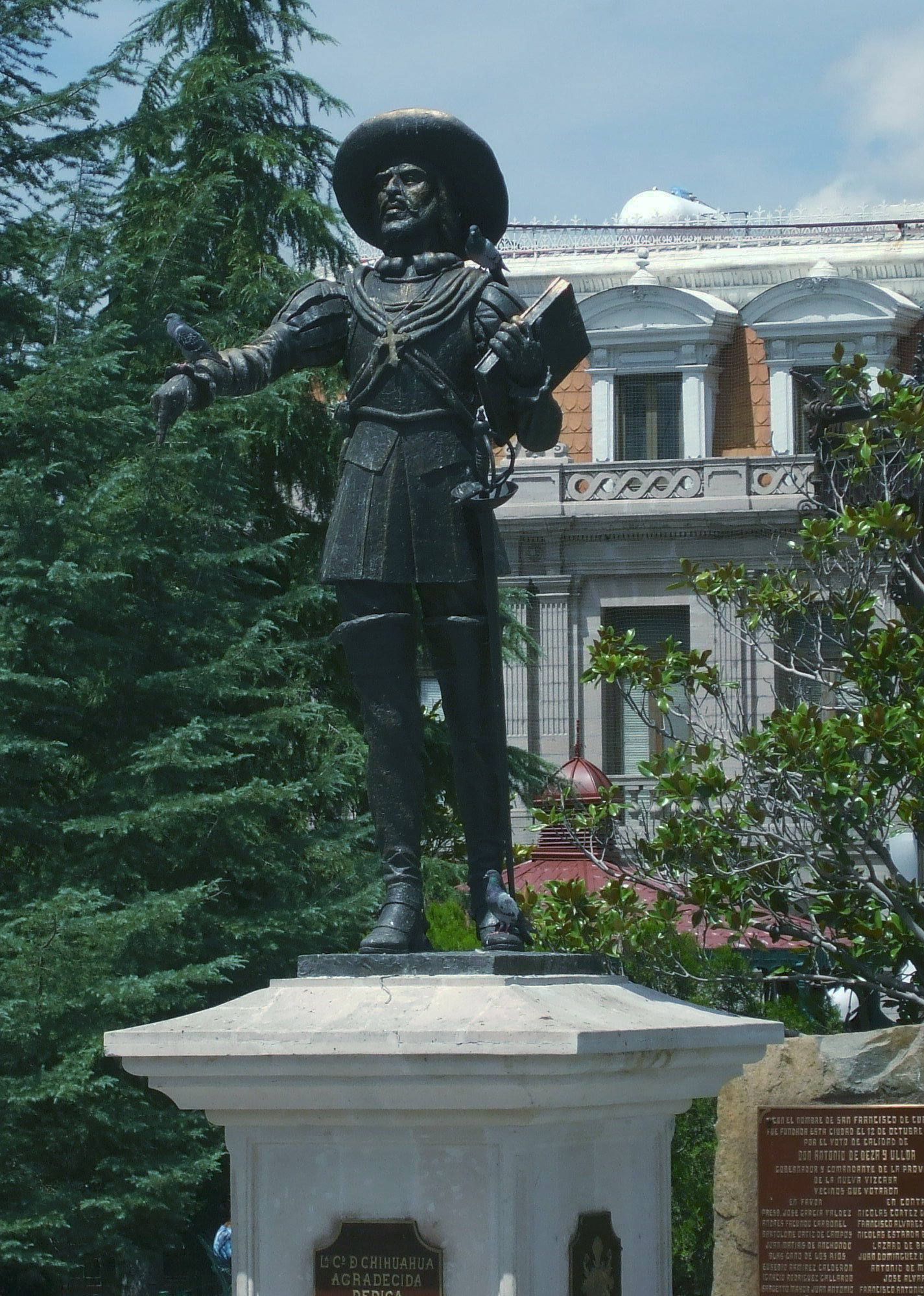
Antonio Deza y Ulloa, founder of Chihuahua

It has been said that the name derives from the Nahuatl language, meaning "between two waters"; other accepted definitions are "place of the holed-rock" or from Rarámuri, "dry and sandy place". The name itself is older than the Spanish conquest of Mexico. The city was founded on October 12, 1709, by Blas Cano de los Rios and Antonio Deza y Ulloa, a Spanish explorer, as El Real de Minas de San Francisco de Cuéllar. Don Ildefonso de Irigoyen donated the land for the city foundation. The town was raised to the status of Villa in 1718 (or 1715) with the name of San Felipe el Real de Chihuahua, and the name was shortened in 1823.

The location was chosen because it is the intersection of the rivers Chuviscar and Sacramento. It is also the midpoint between the Río Bravo del Norte (Rio Grande) and the then-important mining city of Hidalgo del Parral. For much of the 18th century, Chihuahua served as the de facto capital of Nueva Vizcaya because most governors preferred to reside there rather than in Durango, the official capital of the province at that time.

Just as in other parts of Northern Mexico, Roman Catholic missionaries were an important influence during the colonial era, and the city became a meeting point for missionaries heading to and from the 'sierra', the mountainous region in western Chihuahua State where the native Tarahumara still live.

During the War of Independence, the city saw little action. However, it was in Chihuahua where Miguel Hidalgo, considered the Father of the Country, was held prisoner in the Federal Palace of Chihuahua and executed in 1811 at the nearby Government Palace by the Spaniards.

During the Mexican–American War, Chihuahua fell to U.S. forces in 1847, after the Mexican Army was defeated at the Battle of the Sacramento, 15 miles (24 km) north of the city.

During the French invasion, President Benito Juárez made the city the seat of his government-in-exile from 1864 to 1867. During the presidency of Porfirio Díaz the city experienced explosive growth and became one of the most important cities in Mexico. The city became the seat for important banks and wealthy families.

The city was more involved during the Mexican Revolution (1910–1917), for it became at times the operations base for the División del Norte, the army led by Pancho Villa. Many sites and memories remain of the Revolutionary era; the most important of these is the Historical Museum of the Mexican Revolution at Villa's former estate house near downtown Chihuahua. La Quinta Luz was turned into a museum by his widow, Sra. María Luz Corral de Villa, and is now managed by the federal government.

During the 20th century, the city grew in population and learned to take advantage of its proximity with the U.S. border. Until the establishment of foreign manufacturing plants in the 1970s, the city was largely a trade post for cattle and agricultural products. During the 1990s the city grew dramatically economically, becoming the third wealthiest municipality (per capita) in the republic, after Benito Juárez borough of the Federal District (Mexico City), and San Pedro Garza García in Nuevo León.

In 2002, Mayor Jorge Barousse Moreno from the Institutional Revolutionary Party (PRI) died and was succeeded by Alejandro Cano Ricaud. During Cano's administration, the city experienced dramatic growth in the security sector when the Police Department was certified by the ISO and surveillance aircraft bought.

Between 2002 and 2005, the city experimented with the introduction of certain new commercial innovations, like the first large mall in the city, Plaza del Sol, and the rise of the commercial Zone of the Sun, all along the Periférico de la Juventud, one of the main thoroughfares in the city.

In 2004 Juan Blanco Zaldívar, of the National Action Party (PAN), won the election for mayor (municipal president) of the city for the term 2004–2007. Since 2005, the International Festivals of Chihuahua have been celebrated by both the state and city governments during the months of September/October with art shows, plays, stage presentations and concerts by such bands as America, Foreigner, Creedence and Los Lobos being held at venues throughout the city.

Elections for mayor for the term 2007–2010 were held at the beginning of July 2007; Carlos Borruel Baquera of the PAN defeated former mayor Alejandro Cano Ricaud (PRI) by less than one-quarter of a percentage point of almost 200,000 votes cast. The turnout of registered voters, at about 41%, was the lowest in years.

In January, 2010, Mayor Carlos Borruel submitted his resignation in order to campaign for election to the office of Governor of Chihuahua. His deputy, Lic. Alvaro Guillermo Madero Muñoz, assumed the office of mayor for the balance of his term. On July 4, 2013, Javier Garfio Pacheco of the PRI won election for a 3-year term as mayor.

In December 2015, Eugenio Baeza Fares assumed office as mayor of the City of Chihuahua, after Javier Garfio Pacheco requested licence to pursue the possibility to become the candidate for the political party PRI to Governor of the State of Chihuahua. After Garfio lost his bid for Governor Candidate, he returned and ended his period as mayor.

In July 2016, María Eugenia Campos Galván (PAN) was elected mayor. She was elected Governor of Chihuahua in 2021.

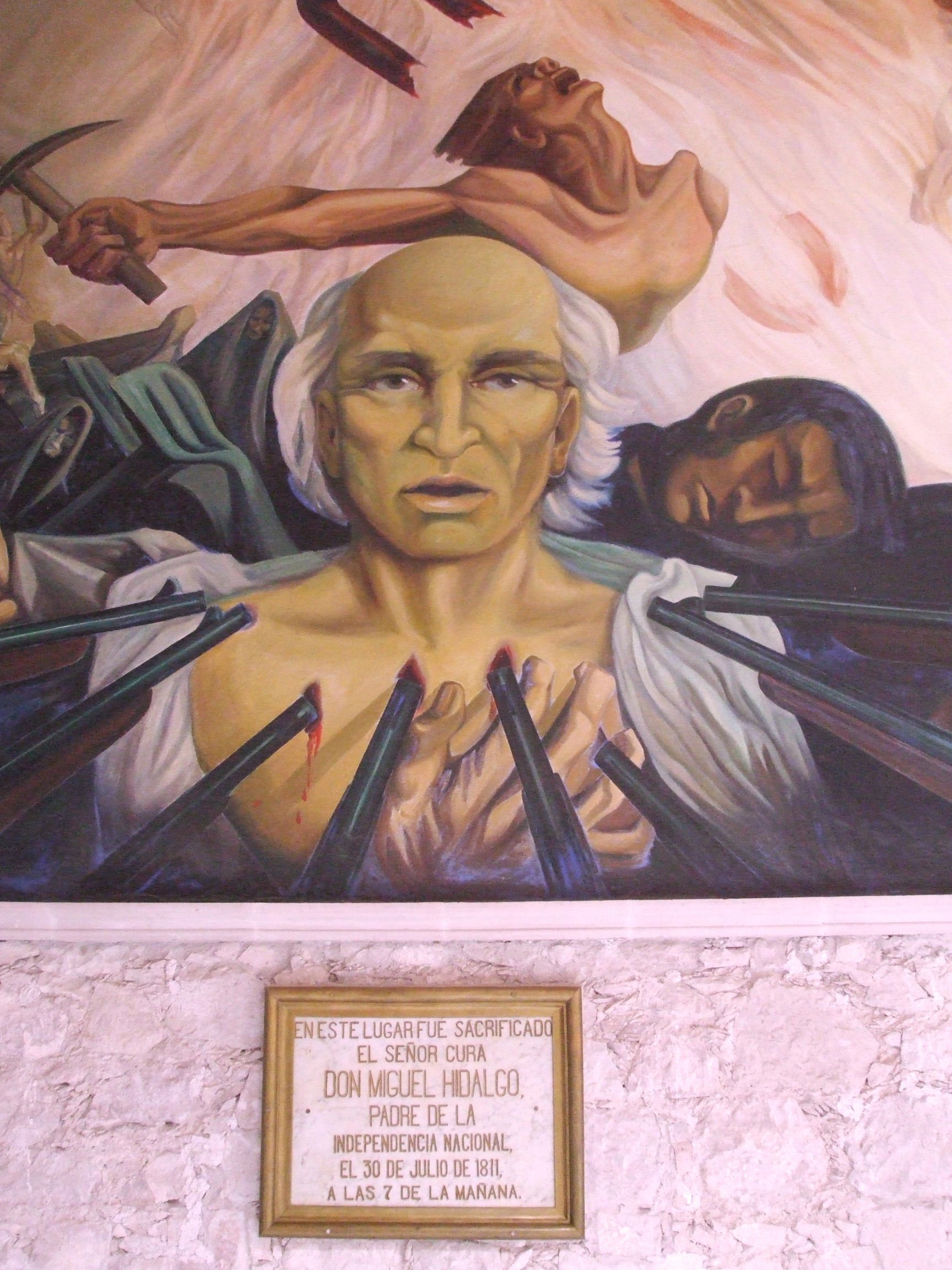
Execution of Miguel Hidalgo y Costilla depicted in a mural by Aarón Piña Mora in the Government Palace of Chihuahua.

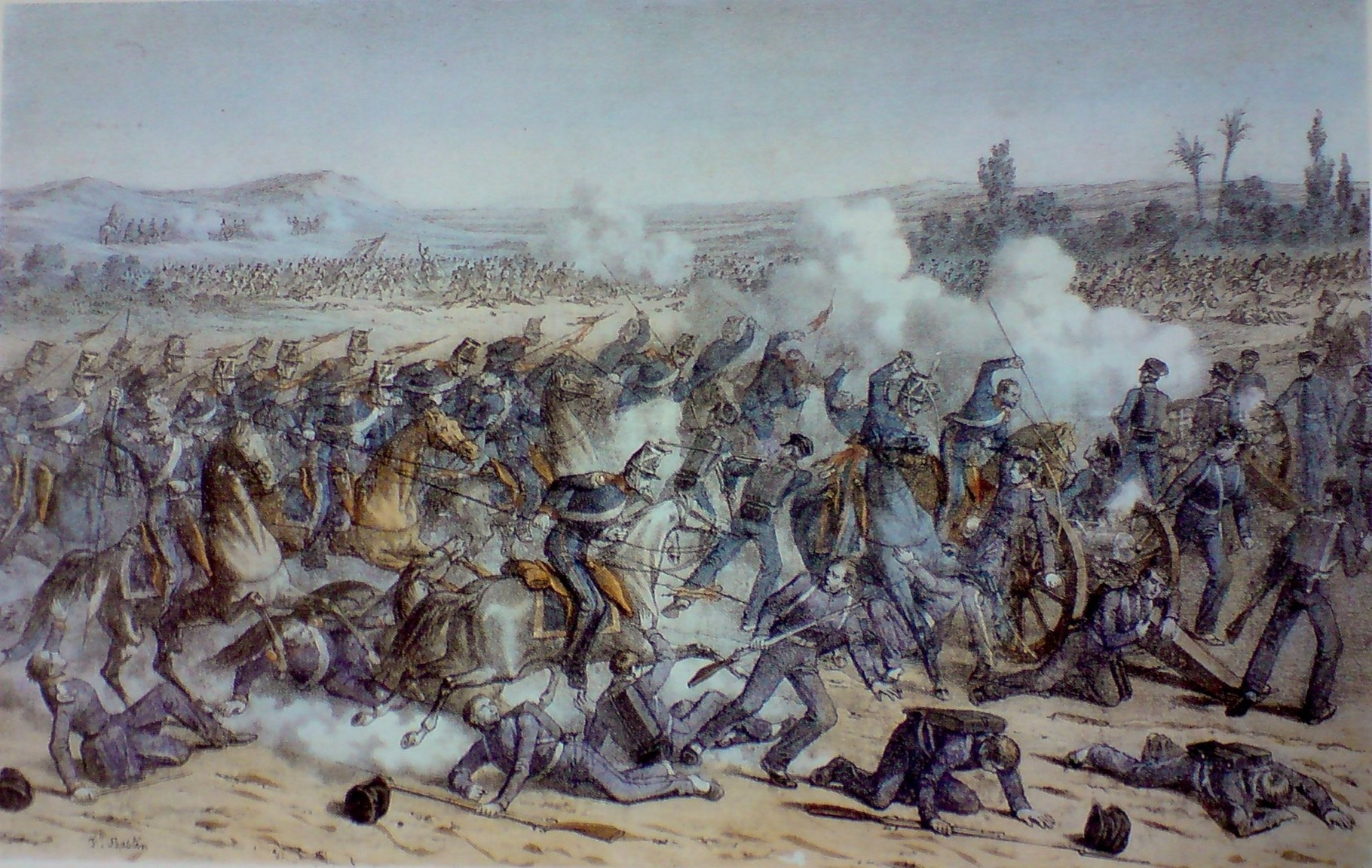
Battle of the Sacramento, 1847

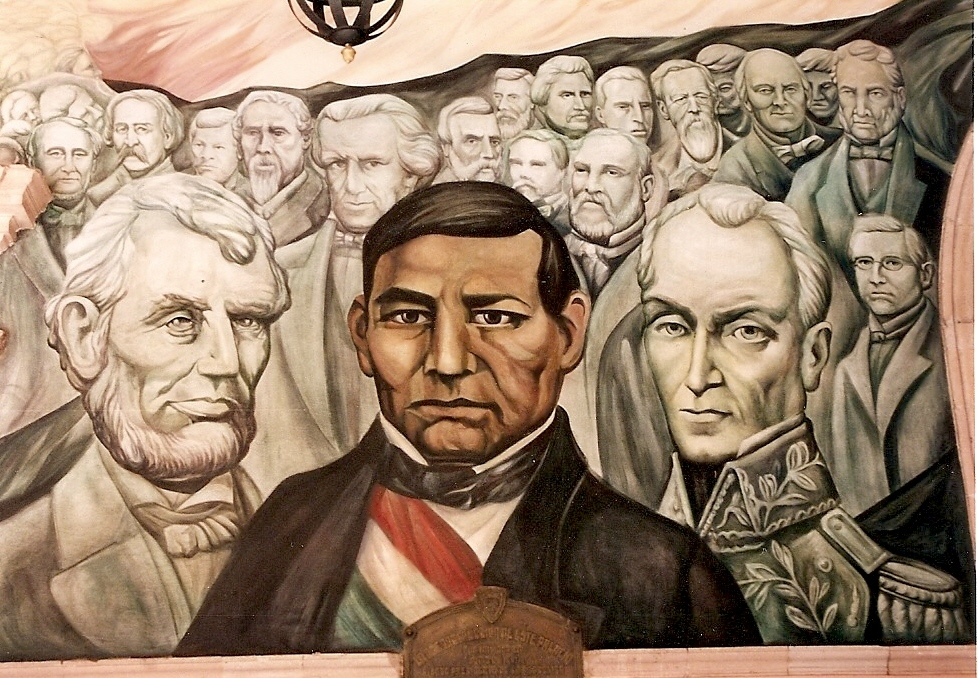
Panel of Piña mural in the Government Palace, honouring the liberators Abraham Lincoln, Benito Juárez and Simón Bolivar

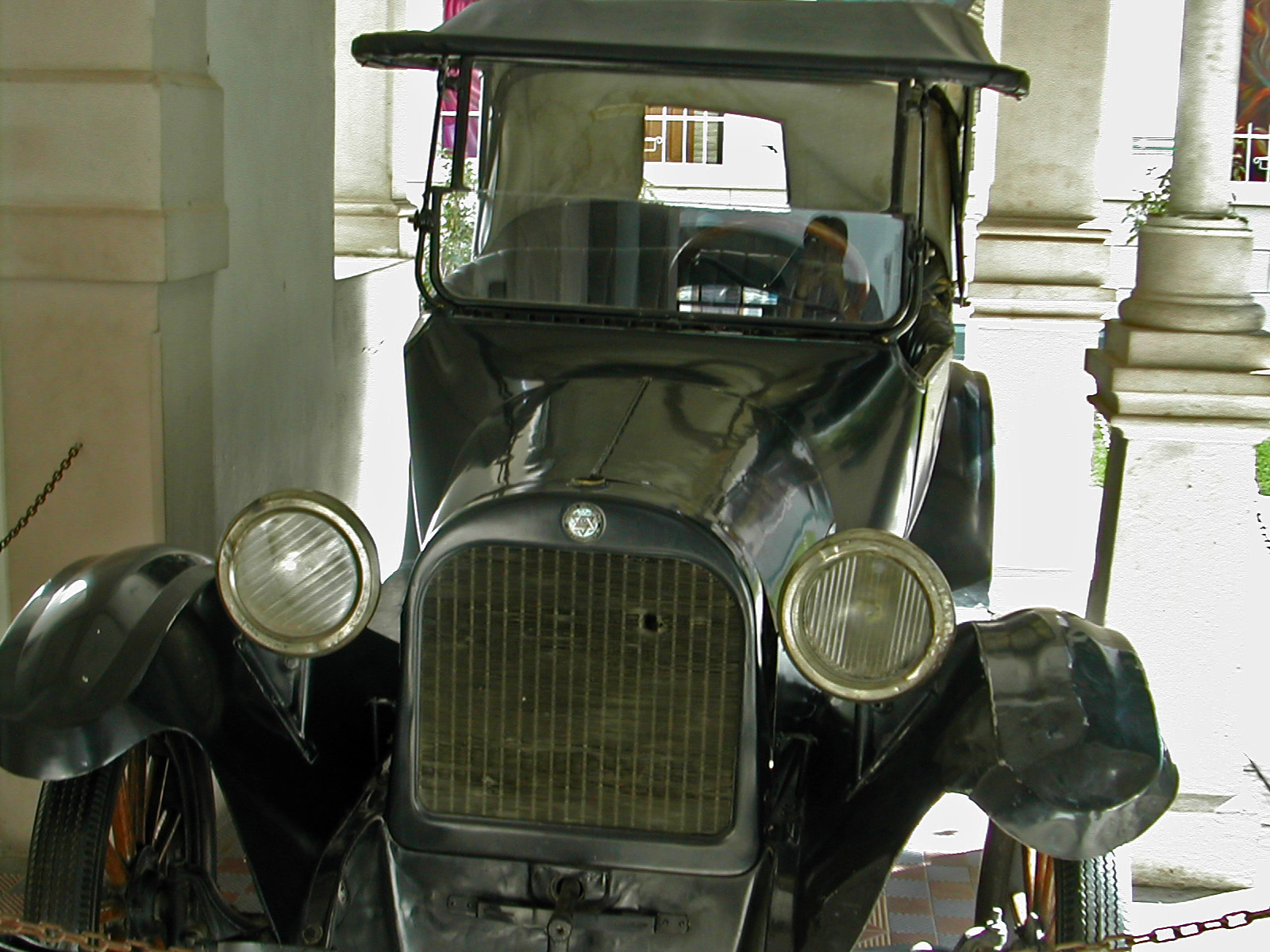
Pancho Villa's bullet-riddled Dodge in the Historical Museum of the Mexican Revolution

=== Foundation ===
The origin of the city of Chihuahua was the discovery of the nearby mines, and the foundation of the settlement of Santa Eulalia in 1652 by Spanish captain Diego del Castillo; however, due to the climate and constant attacks by the indigenous people the exploitation was suspended, and Santa Eulalia remained uninhabited for several years. Some fifty years later, in 1707, more rich mining discoveries were made, leading to the immediate settlement of Santa Eulalia and its prosperity.

However, Santa Eulalia is located in the middle of a mountain range, and the difficult terrain hindered the construction and expansion of the city; because of this, when in 1709 the governor of Nueva Vizcaya, Antonio de Deza y Ulloa visited the settlement, with the instruction to found the head of the Real de Minas, he decided to convene 16 notable neighbors (miners, traders, government officials and priests) to resolve with them the desirability of setting up Santa Eulalia herself at the head of the Royal de Minas or founding for them a new settlement in the nearby valley at the confluence of the rivers Chuvíscar and Sacramento.

On 12 October 1709 the notables voted on the founding of the Royal de Minas, eight of them voted for establishment in Santa Eulalia itself, while the remaining voted for foundation in the valley. Faced with the tie, the governor Deza y Ulloa intervened with his casting vote for foundation in the valley of the Junta de los Ríos; this is now regarded as the official foundation of Chihuahua and Antonio Deza y Ulloa as its founder. The new Real de Minas was founded under the name of Real de Minas de San Francisco de Cuéllar in honor of the then Viceroy of New Spain, Francisco Fernández de la Cueva Enríquez, 10th Duke of Alburquerque and Marquis de Cuéllar.

=== Spanish Colony ===
The growth of the Real de Minas, driven by mines and activity of the surrounding farms continued during the colony; because of this on October 1, 1718, it stands at the Royal of San Francisco de Cuéllar in Villa, with the name of San Felipe el Real de Chihuahua'; Saint Philip in honor of the king Felipe V of Spain and being used for the first time the name of Chihuahua. At this time it is also solved the construction of a parish temple worthy for the village, to that end, the city council decided to impose a special tax on silver extracted from the mines of Santa Eulalia and with it was built the temple that today is the Cathedral. By the year 1786 the Villa de Chihuahua was a Mayor's and on April 1, 1797, the first census was lifted in the city of Chihuahua by Don Fructuoso Simón de Herrera with the following summary: 324 men, 396 women, total 720 inhabitants.

In the 18th century, an aqueduct with quarry arches pouring water into a fountain in the main square was built in the city. Then elegant houses appeared, some with wooden floors worked with rich woods brought from the mountains; these houses had orchards with fruit trees and vegetables, chicken coops and smaller cattle. Wealthy miners like the Irigoyen and Carbonel decorated their mansions with luxurious furniture, magnificent paintings, silverware and beautiful porcelain. In the name of the king of Spain came the "visitors" to investigate the morality and justice of the kingdoms and to collect taxes. They read heralds through the streets, which enacted good treatment of indigenous people; Despite this they were confined and restricted by their freedom, always being under the rule of the Spaniards, Creoles and mestizos. With this mixture of races he was writing, over the centuries, the history of the capital. As in other parts of northern Mexico, the peregrinos Catholicism greatly influenced the colonial era, and the city became a meeting point for pilgrims on their way to "La Sierra", a mountainous region in which the indigenous people had not yet converted to Catholicism.

Also built in the city was a college run by the Society of Jesus, which built a solid building on the east end of the village, later and after the expulsion of the Jesuits, the school building was used as a barracks, prison and mint.

=== Independence ===
The information on the beginning of the Independence of Mexico movement took a long time to reach the then Villa de Chihuahua, where in practice it had no effect, because of this The Royalists decided that the trial of the insurgents apprehended in Acatita de Baján will be held in Chihuahua. On April 23 the prisoners entered Chihuahua to be tried and on June 26 the insurgents Ignacio Allende, Mariano Jiménez, Juan Aldama and Manuel Santamaría are shot in the convent of San Francisco. On 30 July, don Miguel Hidalgo y Costilla was shot in the courtyards of the military hospital, a place formerly the convent of Loreto. During the rest of the war of independence the situation in Chihuahua was practically identical and without any shock.

Once independence was consummated through the Treaties of Cordoba, and after the ephemeral First Mexican Empire, on 19 July 1823 the Union Congress issued a decree dividing the former province of the New Biscay in two, the Province of Durango and the Province of Chihuahua, and pointed by capital of the latter to the Villa of San Felipe el Real de Chihuahua, which from that moment was erected in city, and was called Chihuahua'.

=== Post-Independent time ===
During the Mexican–American War, Chihuahua was occupied by a column of the U.S. Army under Alexander Doniphan, who came from [New Mexico], had previously occupied Santa Fe and El Paso. For the defense of Chihuahua, the Battle of Sacramento, on February 28, 1847, was enlisted with the invaders, with the full defeat of Mexican forces dispersed, the state government moved to Parral and March 1 the U.S. military occupied the city. On March 7, 1848, the second occupation of the Anglo-Americans occurred and Governor Trías evacuated Chihuahua and was occupied by the invading chief Sterling Price. This situation lasted until 25 July, when the capital was evicted by the invaders. The legitimate authorities resettled in their official residence on 14 August of the same year.

=== La Reforma ===
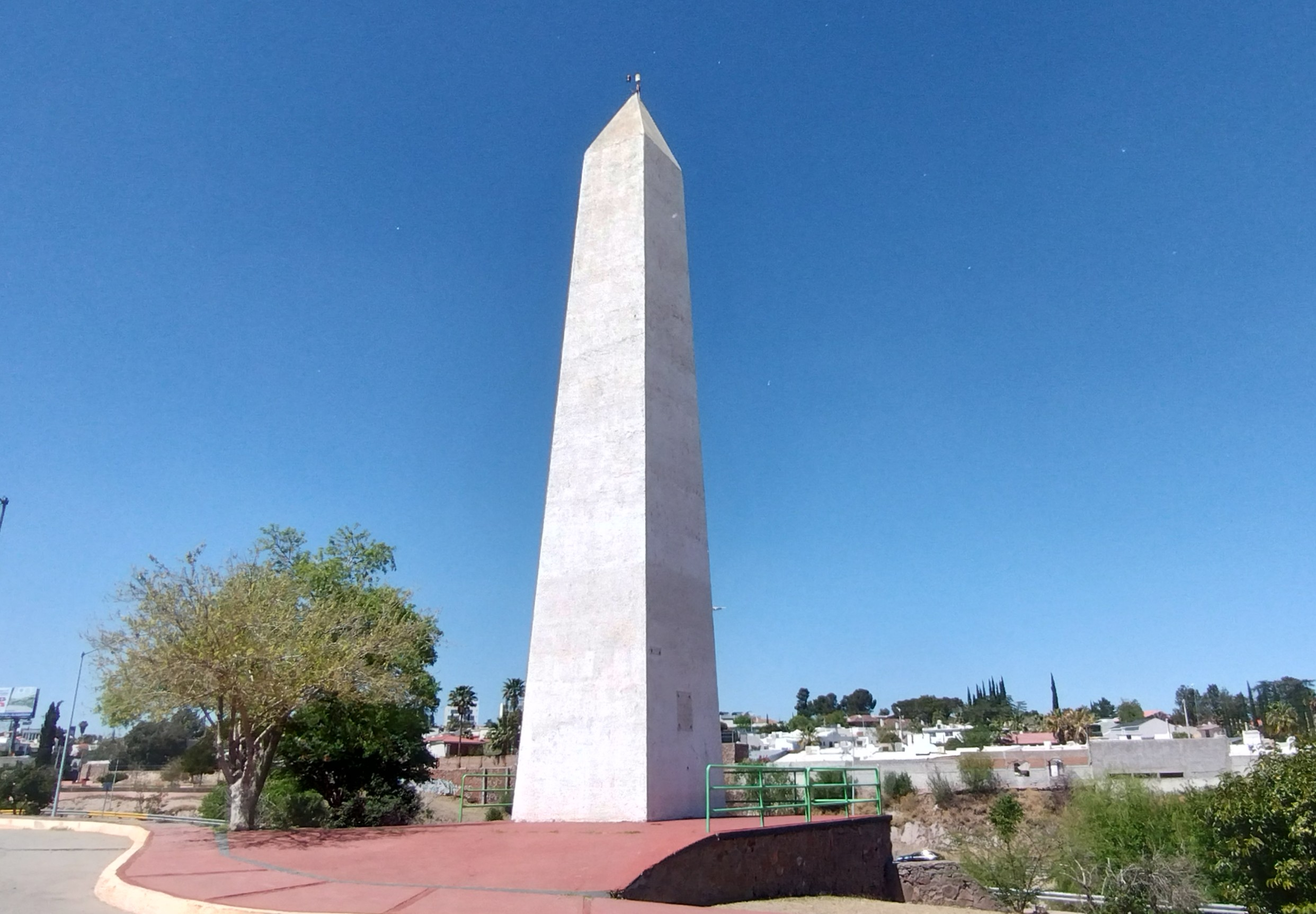
Monument to the Battle of Arroyo del Mortero, fought in 1860

On January 4, 1858, within the War of Reformation, which generally dominated the liberal party with the exception of two short seasons in which the conservatives occupied the capital by armed hands, Lieutenant Colonel Bruno Arriada and Mr. Juan N. Bárcenas seduced the garrison forces, proclaimed the Tacubaya Plan and set a half-hour deadline for the governor, Mr. Antonio Ochoa, to sign his accession. He retired to Aldama, gathered the national guard under the command of Colonel José Esteban crowned and the next 19 recaptured the capital.

On May 5, 1862, Don Mariano Sáenz built at his expense the first building specifically intended for theater, was called "Teatro de Zaragoza", was located in the street of La Libertad, near the current Plaza de Merino and premiered with the play "Los French in Mexico." On September 15, 1877, it was inaugurated by the governor of the state, General Angel Trías the "Teatro Betancourt", located in the street of La Libertad, built by the Jalisciense Don Miguel Betancourt, who was located in Chihuahua for more than twenty years. With a celebration of the "Scream of Independence", it lasted until May 27, 1904, when it was destroyed by fire. The "Coronado Theatre" opens, which was in ojinaga street and also disappeared from a fire. Mr. Betancourt built it. On 12 October 1864, the head of the Federal Executive Power, Mr. Benito Juárez, arrived in the city on the occasion of the events of the French intervention and the empire. He was accompanied by his Secretaries of State, dispatched to the official residence of the state government. It remained until August 5, 1865, when it took the northern way; returned to the capital on 20 November and returned to the border on 9 December. The last season remained in Chihuahua from 17 June to 10 December 1866. At this time the 3 ships that overlook the now Victoria Street, part of the Municipal Palace, were sold to support the expenses demanded by the movement of troops on the occasion of the departure of President Juárez and his Ministers in the direction of Paso del Norte.

At the time of the Reformation it was in fact, for two years, capital of the Republic and seat of the Federal Powers, as the former Government Palace, today Museo Casa Juárez, became from 1864 to 1866, the National Palace and the residence of President Benito Juáre z and their ministers.

On March 25, 1866, a battle was set in the Plaza de Armas, the French imperialists were quartered in the Cathedral and General Terrazas was moving through Victoria and Independence streets, it was practically impossible to enter the cathedral, until it was decided that it would be cannoned and from Coronado and Ocampo streets they did, the 8 kg bullet. weight fell just in the bell breaking it in half, after this fact the French went out to surrender and recovered the city. The bell was declared by the city hall historical monument and still today can be seen inside Cathedral.

=== Porfirian era ===
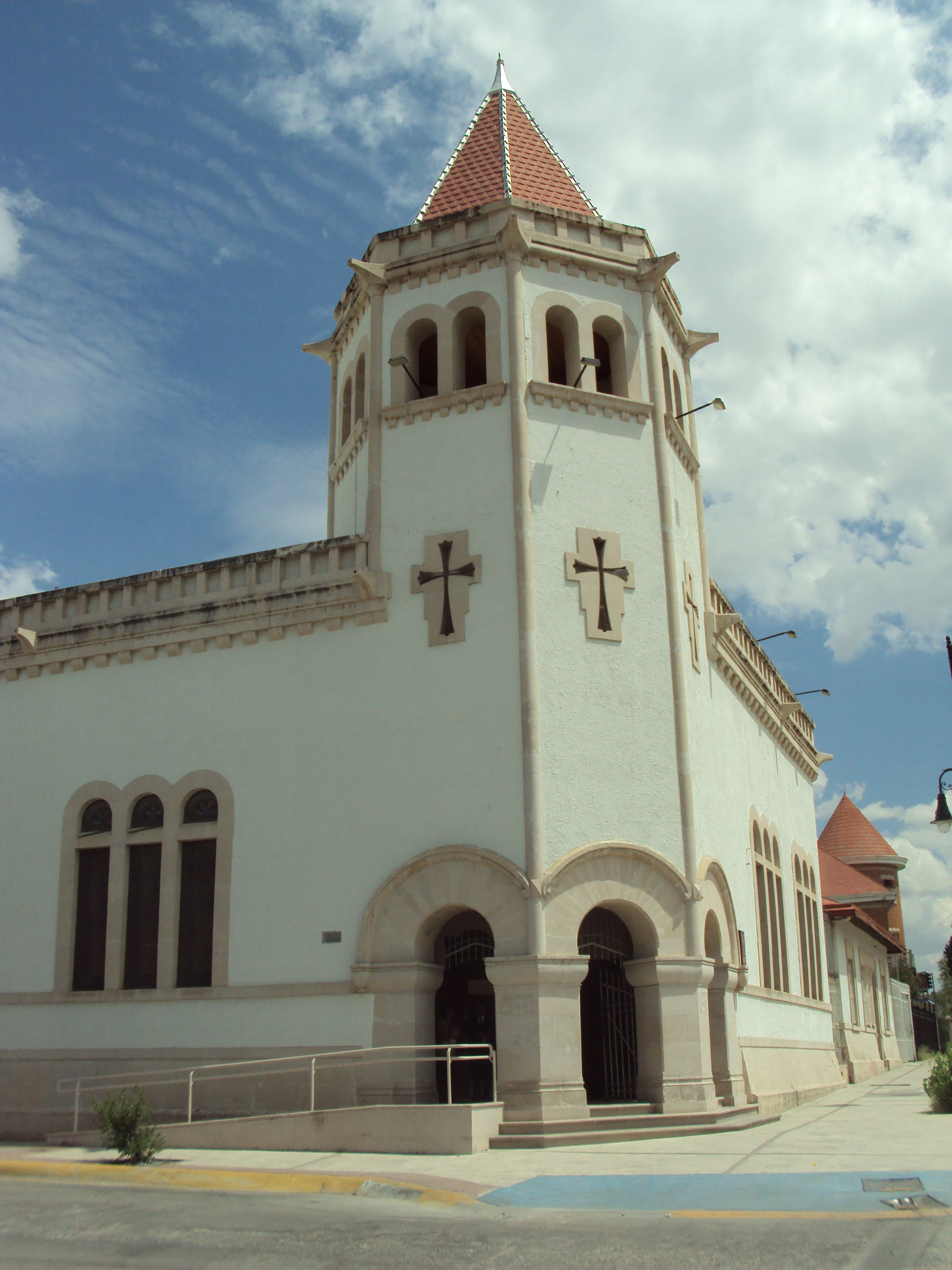
The Trinity Methodist Temple.

In 1875, the images began to be reproduced on paper or cardboard, based on the daguerreotype, and because in 1863 the Anglo-American Henry W. Barquer was established and on March 2, 1876, the telegraph was inaugurated in the short stretch between the government house (J street) not uarez. 321) and the stage station called "La Despedida" (Bolívar and 10a walk) On April 23, the service between Chihuahua and Rosales was inaugurated and in August 1877 with Mexico City. The city's first telegraphist was named Francisco Hernández.

On June 2, 1876, Colonel Angel Trías rebelled in favor of the Tuxtepec Plan, seize the capital and take the constitutional governor, Lic. Antonio Ochoa, prisoner. The term-appointed surrogate, Manuel de Herrera, dispatched successively in Cusihuiriachi, Guerrero and Camargo, raised the national guard and joined the government troops. Defeated by the Porphyrists at the Avalos ranch on 19 September, the legitimate authorities resumed the exercise of their duties in the capital.

On February 6, 1877, General Juan B. Camaño, at the head of a Tuxtepecana brigade, occupied the capital, deposed the constitutional authorities, assumed the political and military command of the state and began the new era.

On May 5, 1881, the first telephone line was inaugurated by Félix Francisco Maceyra, manager of Banco Mexicano. This line was between the bank offices, corner of Independencia Avenue and Victoria Street and the address of the mint, located where the Federal Palace is located. Three years later there were a hundred and fifty urban service aircraft and the long-distance aircraft began operating on 1 April 1930. On March 24, 1883, the first telephone communication of two populations was established, were Chihuahua and Aldama. In 1884, the Chihuahua telephone company was founded.

In 1882, as governor, General Luis Terrazas, the installation of the metal pipe was started, which gradually spread and branched. Auxiliary lime and singing ditches and piles and fountains were disappearing from the city grounds. On September 16, 1882, the first section of the railway line, from Juárez to Chihuahua, built by Ferrocarril Central Mexicano, was inaugurated, which since 1909 belonged to the system of the National Railways of Mexico. On March 8, 1884, communication was opened to Mexico City and on the 23rd passenger and freight trains began to run.

In 1883, the first typewriters were established by the main commercial houses. They began to be used in public offices in 1891, during the local administration of Colonel Lauro Carrillo.

At the end of 1884, the first line of urban trams was inaugurated between Plaza de la Constitución and the primitive station of the National Railways. They moved by shooting beasts, then, in August 1908, they moved with electric force. They disappeared in early 1922.

On September 11, 1891, the Government Palace of Chihuahua was completed by Governor Carrillo. However, the official inauguration was on 1 June 1892 by the same governor. The report published by the Directorate General of Statistics gave the city of Chihuahua, in 1895, the number of 19,520 people. At the end of the 19th century, Tomás Alva Edison's phonographs arrived in the city, which had numerous extension lines and had to be applied to people's ears to perceive sound reproductions. In the second half of 1902, the first car arrived in the city of Chihuahua, brought by Don Mauricio Calderón, and the second was introduced by Colonel Miguel Ahumada, governor of the state.

In the early years of the twentieth century, in Chihuahua there was more foreign investment in non-railway enterprises than in any other region of the country, which allowed foreigners to infiltrate at all levels of local social and economic. The population growth of the city creates the need to look for new sources to provide it with water and on September 16, 1908, the Chuvíscar dam was inaugurated, with a capacity of five million cubic meters of water, the cost was one million pesos. The preliminary study of Ing. Aguilar was taken advantage of, the final project and specifications were entrusted to the Ing. Manual Marroquín and Rivera and the construction was contracted with engineers Sheperd and Mac Quatters. From this year the landscape of industrial boom began to blur, presenting the first signs of the economic and social crisis that was exacerbated in 1910, on the occasion of the first revolutionary outbursts. In 1911, the city was held by the "rises" under the command of Pascual Orozco.

=== Mexican Revolution ===
During the stage of the Revolution, Chihuahua was the scene of the Madero anti-re-election movement and, later, the development of constitutionalism and Villismo, highlighting the heroic figures of Praxedis G. Guerrero, Abraham González, Toribio Ortega, Pascual Orozco, Francisco "Pancho" Villa and many others.

On 30 and 31 October 1911, the President-elect of the Republic Francisco I. Madero, visits for the second time the city, having made the trip expressly to invite the Chihuahuenses revolutionary chiefs Abraham González, Pascual Orozco, José de la Luz Blanco, José de la Luz Soto, Máximo Castillo and others, to accompany at the event of their protest as the holder of the Federal Executive.

The constitutional reform of October 28, 1911 abolished political headquarters in the state and created the free municipality. This provision began to govern from 1 January 1912, and since then, each municipality is administered by a popularly elected municipality, without any dependence on the others, whose presidents are directly understood with the governor of the state, there should be no intermediate authority among them.

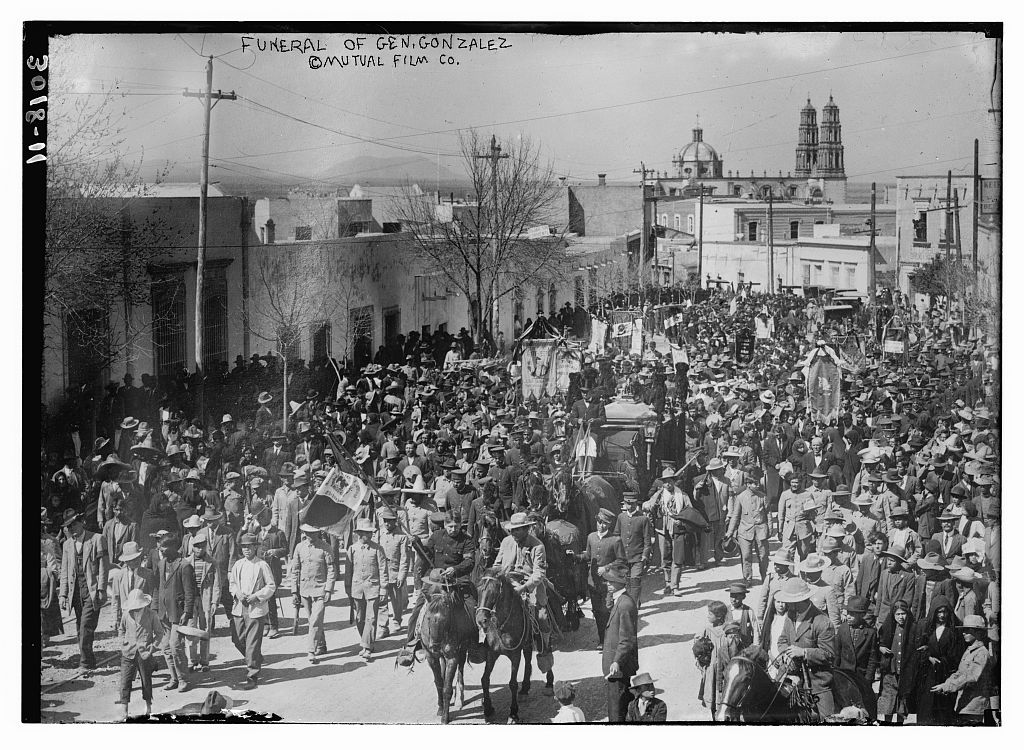
Governor Abraham González's funeral on March 1913. The Governor was murdered by orders of General Antonio Rábago, a subordinate of Victoriano Huerta.

On December 8, 1913, Francisco Villa arrived at the place, accepting the appointment of Provisional Governor of the State, which granted him a Board of Generals; in its new role, on the 12th of the same month, it decreed the creation of the Bank of the State of Chihuahua, with guarantee of the properties confiscated from the enemies of the revolutionary cause and empowered to issue banknotes, it would close definitively in 1915. The state capital was the center of operations of the Northern Division. On April 13, 1914, Don Venustiano Carranza arrived in the city of Chihuahua, from Juarez, during his crusade against the military dictatorship of General Victoriano Huerta. He was enthusiastically welcomed by the Chihuahua people, whom he greeted from the central balcony of the Government Palace announcing the social reforms demanded by the revolution and was housed in the Fifth Gameros. The next day he received the report of the governor of the state, General Manuel Chao, on the state of the public administration and the following March 3 he moved to the city of Torreón.

In 1914, General Francisco Villa had a radiotelegraph station set up in the city of Chihuahua, which was the first to work. The facilities were made in the Municipal Palace and the antennae were placed in the towers of the cathedral.

At the end of January 1915, General Francisco Villa, supreme head of military operations, was incommunicado with the convention government, which had had to withdraw from Mexico City towards Cuernavaca. For this reason, the expressed general issued a decree authorizing himself to assume the management of public business in the territory dominated by his forces and created three departments of state for their attention, namely the Relationships Ministry, Government and Communications, and Treasury and Development. Through these departments General Villa executed all the acts of a head of state until the end of 1915. At the end of 1915, the villist regime in the capital ended.

Revolutionary's From 1920 onwards the reconstruction of the economy began, re-emerging some important factories of the porphyriate era that had closed on the occasion of the revolution. Such was the case for the brewing industry, foundries, flours and textiles, where machinery driven by steam, electric power or gasoline was worked on, which continued with an advanced technological level.

The districts continued to be maintained but exclusively as districts with judicial functions, in October 1921 the Iturbide district changed its name to aragon

In December 1923, the first radio-telephone station was installed that operated in the city, by agreement of the governor of the state, General Ignacio C. Enríquez and had the official record "XICE". At the same time, radio-receiver devices, which were popularly referred to as "radiolas", began to be installed in homes. On November 1, 1929, the first vitáfono or spoken cinema in the "Alcázar cinema" was adapted to the cinematographer, was with the film "The Jazz Singer". In early 1931, the first lines of urban and semi-urban trucks began to circulate through the streets of the city. At this time the city had 45,595 inhabitants.

On June 21, 1941, the Palace of Government, this fire begins in the General Archive of the Executive Branch at 1 p.m. on Saturday and the Municipal Palace became the official residence of the supreme Legislative and Executive powers, until September 15, 1944, when they went back to their own building.

In 1946, the Reforma Market was set on fire, during the municipal administration presided over by Mr. Alberto de la Peña Borja. As president, Esteban Uranga built another market building, with the same title and farther from the city center. On September 26, 1947, the sports city was inaugurated by the President of the Republic, Mr. Miguel Alemán, being governor of the state, Dr. Fernando Foglio Miramontes; at the time it had a stadium with capacity for eight thousand people, monumental gym, eight pediments, tennis courts, basketball, volleyball, park and baseball stands, Olympic pool, an artificial forest of ten and seven thousand trees, electrification for night service in all sports sections and transformers in the baseball field, sports court for athletic events, boxing fields, dressing rooms, toilets, etc. Except for mining, industrial activity had not been a substance in the local economy, but from 1947, with the opening of Cementos de Chihuahua, a significant change was initiated in the industry, which was accentuated in 1960 with the establishment of maquiladoras export in the cities of Juarez and Tijuana first, and then in Chihuahua. 47 floors are installed with 24,500 workers, especially women. On November 9, 1947, the Government Palace by the then President of the Republic, Mr. Miguel Alemán. The Instituto Tecnológico de Chihuahua, known as ITCH, was the first technology institute in Mexico. The first stone was laid on September 26, 1948, by the Secretary of Public Education, Mr. Manuel Guel Vidal and by the constitutional governor of the State of Chihuahua, Mr. Fernando Foglio Miramontes.

=== Contemporary history ===
In 1956, television was installed in the city, with the foundation of XERA-TV by Telesistema Mexicano. In 1960, the construction of the Chihuahua Dam was completed, which would contribute to the supply of water and prevent flooding in a large area of the city. On that year, there were 150,430 inhabitants. On April 5, 1964, political acts were banished in the city's Plaza de Armas, following an act by the PRI candidate for the presidency of the republic, Gustavo Díaz Ordaz, which ends in the burning of the temple by protesters. On October 18, 1968, the University of Chihuahua was granted full autonomy. Earlier this year, XHCH-TV channel 2 is installed, the first television station to be totally local. In coordination with the private initiative, through the newly created Economic Development of Chihuahua, A.D., on September 12, 1980, the state government created the promoter of the Chihuahuense Industry that immediately proceeds to the construction of the Complex Industrial Chihuahua with the Ford plant as an anchor industry; which would subsequently attract new foreign investment and strengthen confidence to establish itself in the region. On the afternoon of July 27, 1981, Aeromexico's DC-9 "Yucatan" aircraft, covering regular flight 230 between Monterrey and Tijuana, went off the runway when landing at Chihuahua airport, for the force of wind and rain. As a result, the aircraft broke and caught fire causing the greatest misgiving in the history of state aviation; 32 passengers arrived alive, but another 32 died.

In September 1981, the Palace of Justice of the State was inaugurated in the city by Mr. José López Portillo, President of Mexico. On July 6, 1983, for the first time the National Action Party, with Luis H. Alvarez, won the elections for the Chihuahua City Council. It is in this year that the state is in the crosshairs of the whole country. From this moment Chihuahua became the obligatory reference for elections in the other northern states and then the entire republic. By 1984, the metropolitan area of the city of Chihuahua had 29 maquiladora plants in the Las Américas Industrial Park, of which those dedicated to the production of electrical and electronic components for export stood out.

In 1986, the year of the hot summer in Chihuahua, due to state, municipal and deputies elections that were lived. The interference of the Catholic Church in political activity as in 1983 caused the spirits to be increased and the Chihuahuanian families divided. The bishop was Don Adalberto Almeida and Merino and threatened not to officiate Mass due to the alleged electoral fraud. On December 27, 1988, the Pope appointed Archbishop José Fernández Arteaga, Coadjutor Archbishop of Chihuahua with the right to succession. He took office on 25 January 1989, and in April of that year most diocesan and religious priests sent the Pope a letter of support to Don Adalberto on the occasion of his 20 years of bishop in Chihuahua. On May 24, 1988, the city of Chihuahua was about to experience a catastrophe of incalculable dimensions when, at 10:10 a.m., the No. 14 tank of the Pemex Plant, which contained more than four million liters of diaphanous, was burned and kept on fire or for more than eight hours, with flames reaching more than 50 meters in height and at 50 meters was a similar tank containing Nova gasoline. About 200,000 people living in ten surrounding colonies were evacuated and the area was cordoned off by the Army and police forces. The fire was stifled shortly after six o't, thanks to the coordinated action of the firefighters of Chihuahua, Delicias, Camargo, Parral, Cuauhtémoc, Aldama and Ciudad Juárez. In 1990, construction began on the Children's Complex called Chihuahua 2000, which houses nearly 10,000 families. In 1998, construction began on the new UACh campus north of the city. By 2008, the South Sports Is inaugurated, in the area of Avalos.

== Demographics ==
As of 2020, the city of Chihuahua had a population of 925,762. up from 809,232 in 2010.

The literacy rate in the city is among the highest in the country at 98%; 35% of the population is aged 14 or below, 60% between 15 and 65 and 5% over 65. The growth rate is 2.4%. The life expectancy for males is 72 years and for women is 79 years.

The city of Chihuahua has achieved several advances in human and social development. According to a report about competitiveness from the CIDE organization ranks Chihuahua as the second most competitive city in the country just behind Monterrey and ahead of Mexico City. This report also ranks Chihuahua as the most Social Competitive city in the country.

=== Tallest buildings ===
An equal sign (=) following a rank indicates the same height between two or more buildings. Freestanding observation and telecommunication towers, while not habitable buildings, are included for comparison purposes; however, they are not ranked.

Rank	Name	Height ft (m)	Floors	Year
-	Isaura Tower (planned)	433 (132)	-	-
1	Lumina Tower	393 (120)	32	2016
2	Sphera Tower	347 (106)	28	2015
3	Azenzo Center 1 (under construction)	334 (101.7)	22	2020
4	Palomar Park Monumental Flag mast	328 (100)	0	1998
5	Santa Fe Tower (under construction)	328 (100)	24	2020
6	Azenzo Center 2 (under construction)	295 (89.5)	19	2020
7	Cénit Tower	291 (89)	21	2012
8	Legislative Tower	288 (88)	18	1975
9	Palacio del Sol hotel	281 (85.82)	19	1980
10	All Lofts Tower (under construction)	240 (73.1)	15	2019
11	Telmex Tower	203 (62)	18	1981
12	Metro Lofts Tower	200 (60)	12	2018
13	Star Medica Hospital	174 (60.8)	13	2017
14	The Gate to Chihuahua	151 (46)	0	2005
15	Azenzo Corporative Tower	147 (45)	11	2018
-	State Supreme Tribunal of Justice Building	147 (45)	10	2017
17	Vetro Corporative Building	134 (41)	10	2018
18	Del Real Building	131 (40)	9	1960
-	Punto Alto 2	131 (40)	9	2002
20	Guizar Building	127 (39)	11	-
21	Banorte Tower	121 (37)	7	-
22	The Angel of Liberty	144 (35)	4	2003
-	La Puerta del Sol	144 (35)	0	-
24	Punto Alto	111 (34)	8	2000
25	Federal Tribunal Building	104 (32)	7	2001
26	Plaza Scotiabank	101 (31)	8	-
27	The Tree of Life	98 (30)	0	-
-	Pit 3 Building	98 (30)	10	2012
-	A.CH.B building	98 (30)	8	-
30	Fiesta Inn hotel	89 (27.29)	7	1993
31	Sheraton Soberano hotel	88 (27.10)	6	-
32	Roma building	86 (26.5)	6	-
33	Corporative Roma Building	80 (24.6)	6	-
34	Banobras Building	75 (23)	6	-
35	Monument Tower	68 (21)	0	2011
36	Mirador Tower	65 (20)	5	-

37 Chihuahua tower 27 floors

=== Landmarks ===
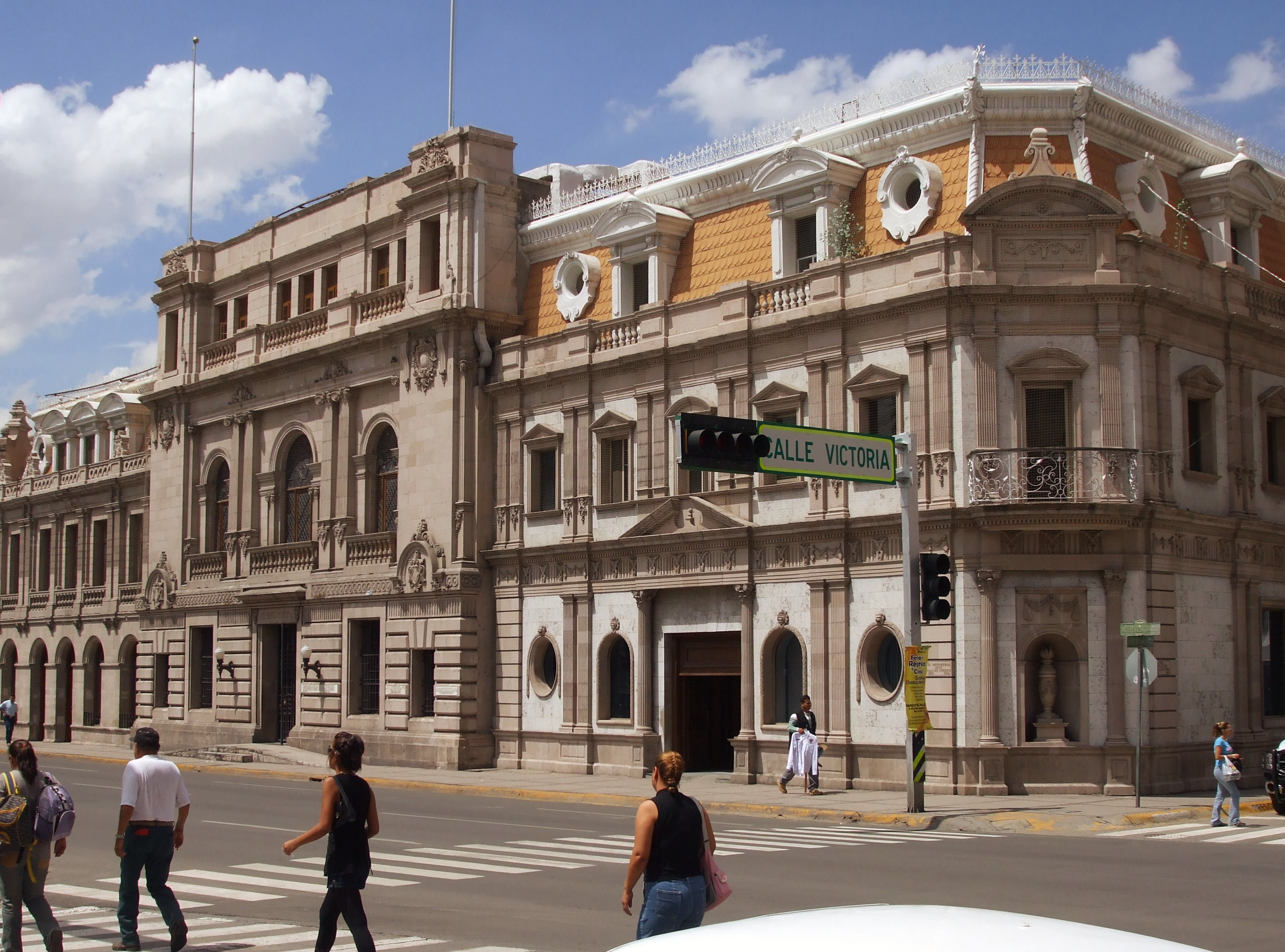
City Hall also fronts onto the Plaza de Armas.

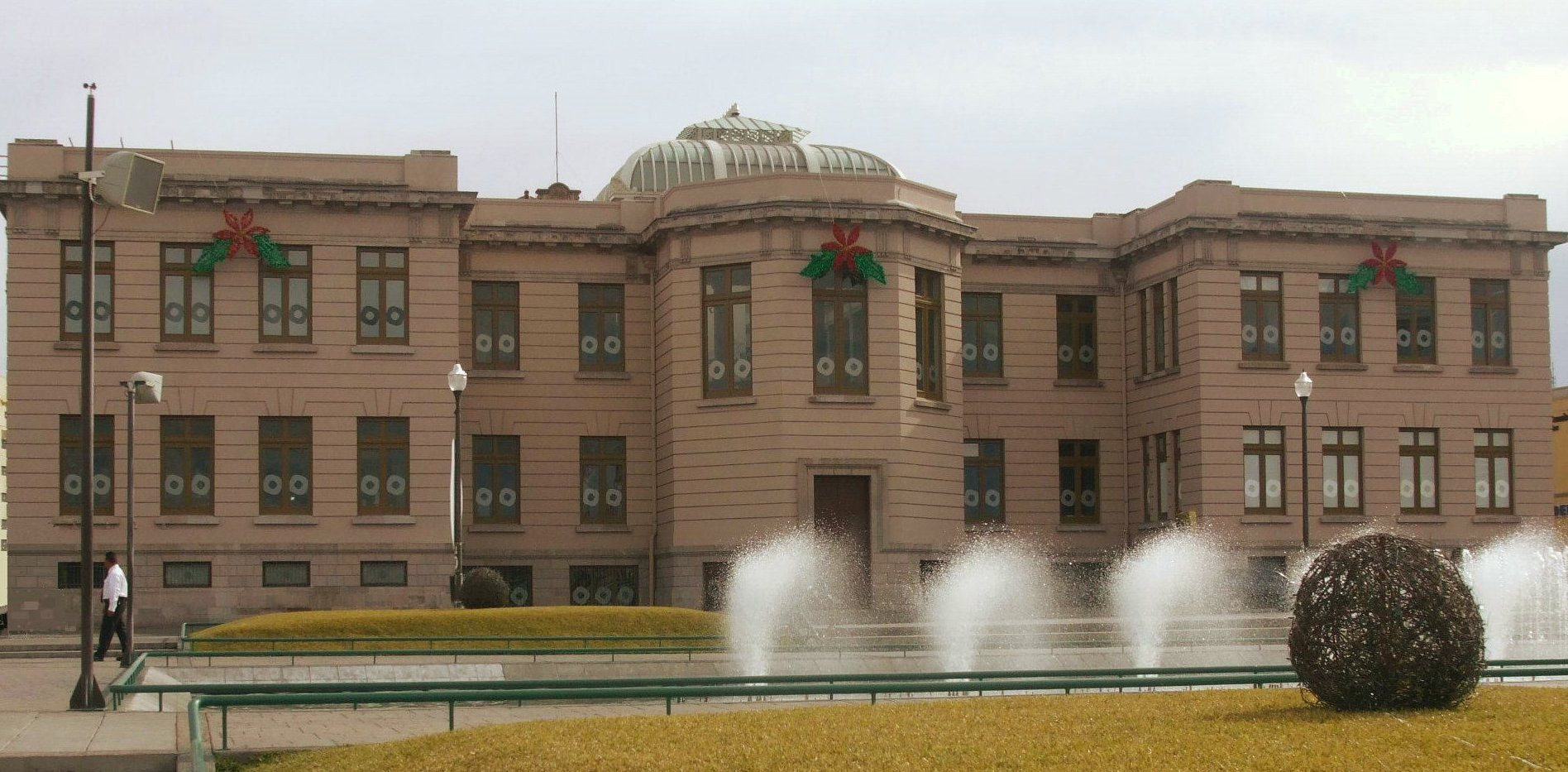
Museo Casa Chihuahua.

Even though Chihuahua suffered a massive destruction of colonial buildings during the 1970s in order to widen the main streets and avenues in the downtown, it stills preserves some valuable monuments from the 19th and 20th centuries. Some of the more interesting sites in the city are listed below:

- Temple of San Francisco, commenced 1717 and completed in 1789-The original burial place of Miguel Hidalgo
- Federal Palace of Chihuahua, now a museum, and the jail cell of Miguel Hidalgo
- Museo Casa Juarez, also called The Museum of the Republican Loyalty, is the house where President Juarez lived during his time at Chihuahua City.
- Central Park "El Palomar"-Once one of the worst slums in the city, now the largest city park.
- Mansion Creel
- Mansion Terrazas
- Mansion 'Quinta Carolina' (Former summer estate of Don Luis Terrazas; see Creel-Terrazas Family.)-Now in semi-ruined condition, in process of restoration.
- Torre Legislativa de Chihuahua (Legislative tower of Chihuahua-state legislators office building) - Fronts on the Plaza de Armas
- The Government Palace (The State House)
- City Hall
- Dancing Fountains north of the Federal Palace
- Mansion 'Quinta Gameros' (City Museum for the Decorative Arts)
- Church of Santa Rita (1731). St Rita of Cascia is the patroness of the city.
- Ave. Zarco Residential Area (Some of the most impressive pre-revolutionary residences in the city are situated along this street)
- Colonial Aqueduct-lengths still exist of this monument which was built to transport water from mountain springs to the villa.

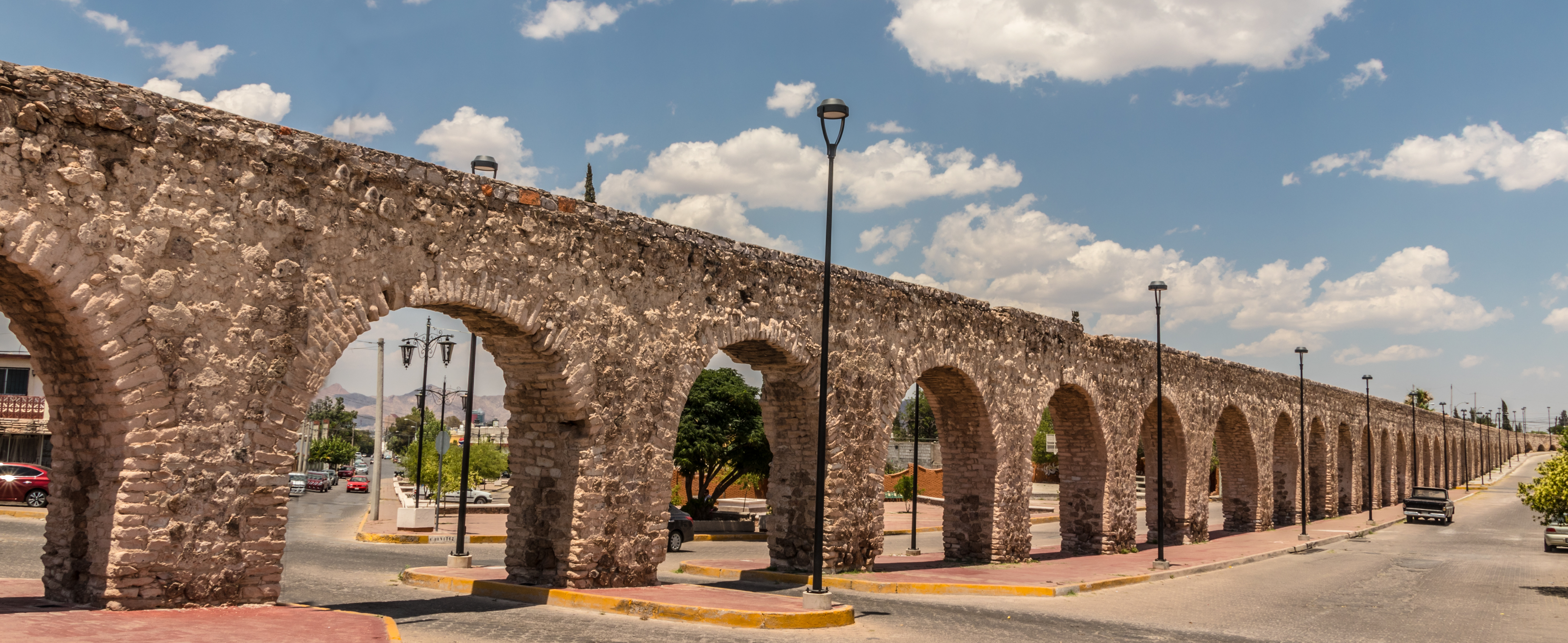
Length of colonial aqueduct in Chihuahua City, 18th century

=== Neighborhoods ===
The City of Chihuahua is subdivided into Colonias (neighborhoods). The primary function of the colonias range between residential, commercial, industrial, and educational.

In recent years, gated residential zones called "fraccionamientos", along with colonias, have been erected. The fraccionamientos function in the same way as residential developments in the U.S. The growing construction industry is creating many new fraccionamientos in order to try to solve the overwhelming demand for new homes in the city, extending them at an ever-increasing rate every year.

=== Malls ===
- Fashion Mall
- Paseo Central
- Plaza Galerías
- Plaza Sendero
- Distrito 1
- Cantera Cinco
- Tres vias shopping center
- Plaza San Felipe
- La Liber
- Plaza Hollywood
- Plaza Victoria
- Plaza Vallarta
- Plaza Providencia
- Plaza Tolsa

=== Parks ===
- El Palomar
- Ciudad Deportiva
- Deportiva Sur
- Parque Metropolitano El Rejon
- Parque Lerdo

There are three country clubs in the city: San Francisco Country Club, Campestre Chihuahua and Altozano.

== Media ==
Internet

- Public Internet:
  - Chihuahua Mobile (Digital Chihuahua) via Wi-Fi.

Private Fixed Internet:

  - Alestra-AT&T.
  - Axtel.
  - Infinitum de Telmex.
  - Izzi Telecom.
  - Totalplay Telecomunicaciones.
  - Cp Comunicaciones Públicas.

Private Mobile Internet:

  - AT&T
  - Movistar.
  - Telcel.
  - Unefon.
  - Virgin
  - Altan

=== Local TV channels ===
Station	TDT	Subchannel	TELEVISION Group / Dependency
XHIT-TDT	23	1.1 HD - Azteca Uno	TV Azteca Chihuahua
XHIT-TDT	23	1.2 SD - ADN 40	TV Azteca Chihuahua
XHCH-TDT	22	1.3 HD - Azteca Uno -1 hora	TV Azteca Chihuahua
XHFI-TDT	26	2.1 HD - Las Estrellas	Televisa
XHFI-TDT	26	2.2 SD - N+ Foro	Televisa
XHCTCH-TDT	29	3.1 HD - Imagen Televisión	Grupo Imagen
XHCTCH-TDT	29	3.3 SD - Maussan Televisión	Grupo Imagen
XHCTCH-TDT	29	3.4 SD - Excélsior TV	Grupo Imagen
XHCHZ-TDT	24	5.1 HD - Canal 5	Televisa
XHECH-TDT	21	7.1 HD - Azteca 7	TV Azteca Chihuahua
XHECH-TDT	21	7.2 SD - a+	TV Azteca Chihuahua
XHCHZ-TDT	24	9.1 SD - NU9VE	Televisa
XHCHI-TDT	25	11.1 HD - Canal Once	Instituto Politécnico Nacional
XHCHI-TDT	25	11.2 SD - Once Niños	Instituto Politécnico Nacional
XHCPAU-TDT	8	14.1 HD - Canal Catorce	Sistema Público de Radiodifusión del Estado Mexicano
XHCPAU-TDT	8	14.2 SD - TV Migrante	Sistema Público de Radiodifusión del Estado Mexicano
XHABC-TDT	34	28.1 HD - Canal 28	Sistema Chihuahuense de Televisión, A.C.
XHABC-TDT	34	28.2 SD - Canal 28.2	Sistema Chihuahuense de Televisión, A.C.
XHICCH-TDT	30	44.1 HD - Canal 44 El canal de las noticias	Grupo Intermedia
XHICCH-TDT	30	44.2 HD - Canal 44 El canal de las noticias -2 Horas	Grupo Intermedia
XHICCH-TDT	30	44.3 HD - Heraldo TV	Grupo Intermedia

=== Cable and private televisión ===
The state capital features cable television with the name "[Izzi Telecom]", which offers Digital triple play and High definition (H.D) service along with Totalplay Telecommunications offering IPTV via fiber optics in addition to the systems satellite television "SKY Mexico' SKY", "SKY Mexico VeTV", "Dish Mexico" and "Star TV Mexico".

==== Radio stations ====
'Modulated Amplitude

Frequency kHz	"'Station'"	Name	Subchannel 'Digital Standard In-band on-channel' IBOC	Radio Group / Dependency	Notes
580	XEFI-AM	Estéreo Mexicana	ND	Grupo Radiorama	•
950	XEFA-AM	La Poderosa	ND	Grupo Radiorama	•
1360	XEDI-AM	La Nueva	ND	Grupo Radiorama	•

Frequency modulation

Frequency MHz	"'Station'"	Name	Subchannel 'Digital Standard In-band on-channel' IBOC	Radio Group / Dependency	notes
88.5	XHDI-FM	@FM	ND	Grupo Radiorama	XEDI-AM additional frequency.
89.3	XHFA-FM	La Poderosa	ND	Grupo Radiorama	XEFA-AM additional frequency.
90.1	XHUA-FM	Estereo Vida	ND	Grupo Radiorama	Changes name to Nick Radio.
90.9	XHAHC-FM	La Caliente	ND	Multimedios Radio	•
91.7	XHBU-FM	La Norteñita	ND	MegaRadio México	•
92.5	XHEFO-FM	Super	ND	Grupo Radiorama	•
93.3	XHBW-FM	Magia Digital 93.3	ND	MegaRadio México	•
94.1	XHHES-FM	Estéreo Sensación	ND	Grupo Radiorama / Grupo BM Radio	•
94.9	XHCHH-FM	D95	ND	Multimedios Radio	•
95.7	XHQD-FM	Romance 95.7	ND	MegaRadio México	•
96.5	XHFI-FM	Estéreo Mexicana	ND	Grupo Radiorama	XEFI-AM station frequency change.
97.3	XHCHI-FM	Imagen Chihuahua	ND	Grupo Imagen	•
98.1	•	Unión Radio Chihuahua	ND	•	Does not appear in IFT lists.
99.3	XHRPC-FM	Stereo Fiesta	ND	Grupo Radiorama	•
100.9	XHLO-FM	Exa FM	ND	Sistema Radio Lobo / MVS Radio	•
101.7	XHV-FM	Radio Fórmula Chihuahua	ND	Grupo Fórmula	•
102.5	XHES-FM	Antena FM	ND	Grupo Radio Divertida	•
103.7	XHHEM-FM	Classic 103.7 FM	ND	Multimedios Radio	•
104.5	XHCHA-FM	Hits FM	ND	Multimedios Radio	•
105.3	XHRU-FM	Radio Universidad 105.3	ND	Autonomous University of Chihuahua	•
106.1	XHSU-FM	El Lobo 106.1	ND	Sistema Radio Lobo	Singers in English, English and Spanish shows
106.9	XHERU-FM	Radio Universidad 106.9	ND	Autonomous University of Chihuahua	XERU-AM station frequency change.
107.7	XHCHC-FM	Palabra Viva Radio	ND	Iglesia Palabra Viva	Does not appear in IFT lists.

ND: No disponible

=== City newspapers ===
- El Ágora.
- El Diario de Chihuahua.
- El Heraldo de Chihuahua by Organización Editorial Mexicana.
- El Heraldo de la Tarde by Organización Editorial Mexicana.
- El Observador.
- El Peso.
- El Pueblo.
- La Crónica Hoy Chihuahua.
- NotiBús.

=== Digital newspapers of the city ===
- Acento Noticias .
- Al Contacto.
- Al Instante Noticias.
- ChihuahuaDigital.
- eldigital.com.mx
- entrelíneas.
- Información Total.
- La Crónica de Chihuahua.
- La Jirafa / e-magazine.
- La Parada Digital.
- La Polaka.
- La Opción de Chihuahua.
- OMNIA.
- Péndulo.
- Periódico Causa Chihuahua.
- Segundo a Segundo.
- Tiempo.
- Vocero Digital.

== Economy ==
Chihuahua is the twelfth largest city in Mexico, and one of the most industrialized. Manufacturing is very important, and there are nine major industrial parks and 79 maquila manufacturing plants, which employ about 45,000 people. The city serves as an alternative destination for maquiladora operators who require quick access to the border but wish to avoid both the higher costs and higher turnover rates of employment of the immediate border area. Of all interior (non-border) locations in Mexico, Chihuahua has the largest maquiladora presence in Mexico. Some of the larger companies include Ford Motor Co., Sumitomo Electrical, Honeywell, Yazaki, Hallmark, and LG Electronics.

The entire state of Chihuahua is also a thriving economic center. Chihuahua's annual Gross State Product (GSP) is about $6.2 billion. There are more than 350 established manufacturing and assembly plants in the state; manufacturing accounts for a third of the total GSP, while trade and other services amount to 53.5%. Chihuahua has the largest amount of forested land in all of Mexico. Forty-four percent of Chihuahua's workers are employed in commerce and services, while a little over a third of the workforce is employed in mining and industry. In mining, Chihuahua state is the leading producer in the republic of non-ferrous minerals and zinc, and is second nationwide in silver extraction. Agricultural production makes up only 6% of the total GSP; however, the state is the leading producer of apples, nuts, cattle and sheep raising nationally, and second in pine and oak trees harvested.

== Contemporary life ==
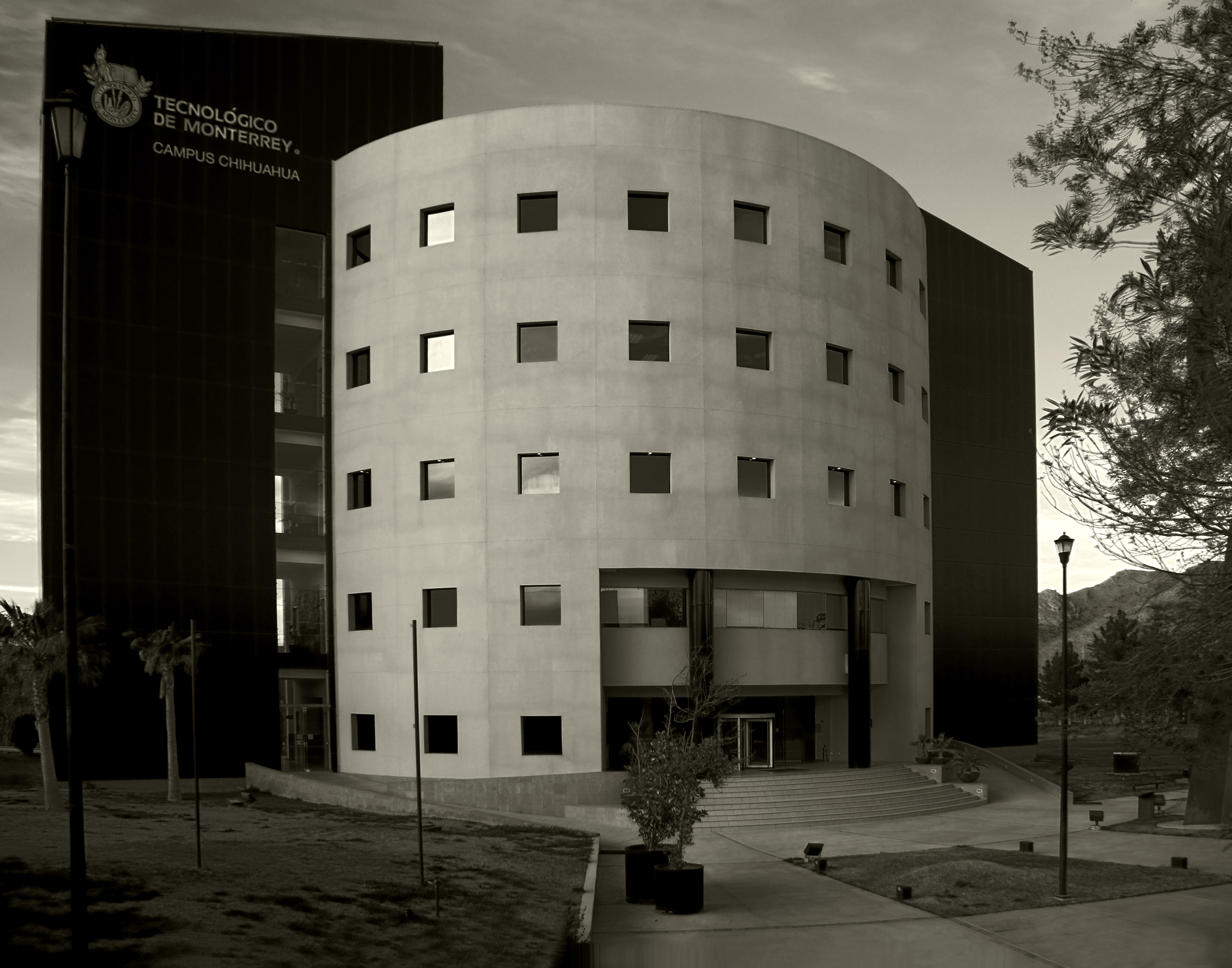
The Chihuahua campus of ITESM.

The city's most important feature is its collection of industrial zones, in which foreign companies have manufacturing facilities, called maquiladoras, which employ thousands of people. This light industry also requires professionals, both for manufacturing and for management; this training is provided by universities such as the Universidád Autónoma de Chihuahua, the Instituto Tecnológico de Chihuahua and Instituto Tecnológico de Chihuahua II. A number of private universities also exist, to include the Chihuahua campus of ITESM.

The city's commercial sector has also been boosted by the growth of the middle class. The wages paid by industries to management and high-level technical employees provide a cash flow unlike that of most Mexican cities.

The nightlife is considered to be lively, people point to the downtown especially; some of the large, pre-revolutionary estate houses have been turned into nightclubs and dance halls, many featuring the most notable of Chihuahua's live bands.

Most U.S. franchise restaurants and fast-food establishments will be found in Chihuahua, mostly on the Periferico de la Juventud, north of downtown on Universidad Avenue, or on Libertad Street Pedestrian Way in the downtown, and are patronised by the city's youth and young professionals.

== Climate ==
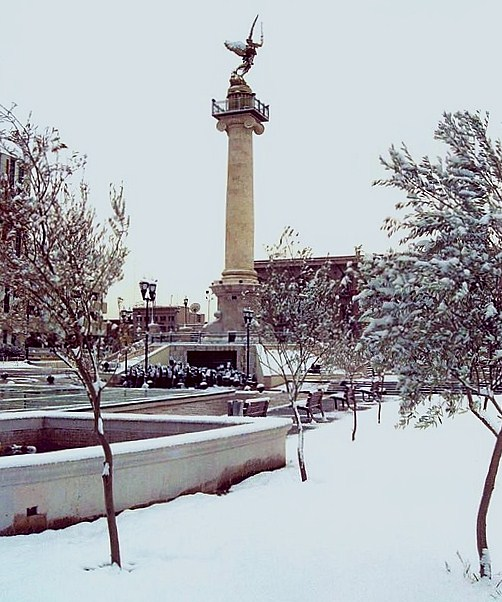
Plaza Mayor after a snowfall.

Chihuahua lies on the western side of the Chihuahuan Desert ecoregion and as such has a hot semi-arid climate (Köppen climate classification BSh). However, it is not as hot as most of the lower elevated portions of the desert to the east owing to an altitude of almost 1,500 metres (4,900 feet) above sea level.

Winters are mild with an average daytime temperature of 18.1 °C (64.6 °F) and an average minimum temperature of 2 °C (35.6 °F) in January, the coldest month. Occasionally, temperatures can exceed 26 °C (78.8 °F) while cold fronts can push it below −10 °C (14.0 °F). Frosts are common during winter nights. During this time of the year, the climate is dry, with an average humidity around 46% and many days are sunny, averaging 15–18 clear days. Precipitation is rare, with only 1 or 3 days with measureable precipitation from December to March. Snowfall is somewhat uncommon in the city, normally with 2 snowfalls a year, although the surrounding area may receive three or four snowfalls.

Summers are hot with June being the hottest month, averaging 33 °C (91.4 °F) during the day and 19 °C (66.2 °F) during the night. Temperatures can easily exceed 32 °C (89.6 °F) on most days and it can occasionally exceed 38 °C (100.4 °F). Most of the precipitation falls during the summer months, when the monsoon moves up northwards, causing moist air from the Gulf of California and the Gulf of Mexico to move into the city. Afternoon storms are common during the monsoon season and they can be accompanied with hail and thunderstorms. The days are still warm to hot in July and August, though slightly cooler due to the presence of the rain, with an average high of 30 °C (86.0 °F). Humidity is also higher during this time, averaging 53%.

March, April, October and November are transitional months that are unpredictable. Temperatures can reach up to 38.5 °C (101.3 °F) in April while cold fronts can push it below freezing. Usually, these months have warm days, averaging 22 °C (71.6 °F) to 28 °C (82.4 °F) and cool nights (around 5 °C (41.0 °F) to 11 °C (51.8 °F)). During the months of March and April, there can be strong winds that cause dusts and sandstorms.

The National Weather Service of Mexico (Servicio Meteorologico Nacional) reports that the highest temperature ever recorded in the city is 41.6 °C (106.9 °F), while the lowest is −18 °C (−0.4 °F) on February 4, 2011. July 1973 is the record wettest month, with 242.5 millimetres (10 in). For a single day the record rainfall is 89.0 millimetres (4 in) on August 24, 1966. Chihuahua averages 3,081 hours of sunshine per year, ranging from a low of 217 hours in December (about 7 hours of sunshine per day) to a high of 305 hours in May (about 9.8 hours of sunshine per day).

Climate data for Chihuahua City (1991–2020, extremes 1932–present)
Month	Jan	Feb	Mar	Apr	May	Jun	Jul	Aug	Sep	Oct	Nov	Dec	Year
Record high °C (°F)	30.0 (86.0)	34.0 (93.2)	37.0 (98.6)	38.8 (101.8)	42.0 (107.6)	43.1 (109.6)	41.6 (106.9)	39.2 (102.6)	39.0 (102.2)	35.0 (95.0)	34.6 (94.3)	29.0 (84.2)	43.1 (109.6)
Mean daily maximum °C (°F)	18.4 (65.1)	21.8 (71.2)	25.1 (77.2)	28.9 (84.0)	32.8 (91.0)	34.8 (94.6)	32.9 (91.2)	31.5 (88.7)	29.6 (85.3)	27.7 (81.9)	22.5 (72.5)	19.0 (66.2)	27.1 (80.8)
Daily mean °C (°F)	10.6 (51.1)	13.5 (56.3)	16.8 (62.2)	20.4 (68.7)	24.3 (75.7)	27.3 (81.1)	26.5 (79.7)	25.2 (77.4)	23.1 (73.6)	19.8 (67.6)	14.8 (58.6)	11.2 (52.2)	19.5 (67.1)
Mean daily minimum °C (°F)	2.8 (37.0)	5.1 (41.2)	8.4 (47.1)	11.8 (53.2)	15.9 (60.6)	19.8 (67.6)	20.1 (68.2)	18.9 (66.0)	16.7 (62.1)	12.0 (53.6)	7.2 (45.0)	3.4 (38.1)	11.8 (53.2)
Record low °C (°F)	−15.0 (5.0)	−18.0 (−0.4)	−9.1 (15.6)	−3.4 (25.9)	0.0 (32.0)	6.1 (43.0)	10.6 (51.1)	10.0 (50.0)	3.7 (38.7)	−3.4 (25.9)	−10.1 (13.8)	−12.5 (9.5)	−18.0 (−0.4)
Average precipitation mm (inches)	6.5 (0.26)	4.0 (0.16)	5.3 (0.21)	7.3 (0.29)	14.5 (0.57)	35.7 (1.41)	97.7 (3.85)	84.2 (3.31)	68.1 (2.68)	23.5 (0.93)	11.7 (0.46)	11.6 (0.46)	370.1 (14.57)
Average precipitation days (≥ 0.1 mm)	2.2	2.1	1.5	1.9	3.6	8.0	14.0	12.5	9.2	3.8	2.8	2.8	64.4
Average snowy days	0.30	0.18	0.09	0.09	0.00	0.00	0.00	0.00	0.00	0.00	0.50	0.88	2.04
Average relative humidity (%)	50.9	41.8	33.8	29.2	29.3	36.2	52.1	56.8	59.1	51.9	52.0	51.9	45.4
Mean monthly sunshine hours	185	204	254	278	299	273	240	242	229	238	191	174	2,807
Source 1: Servicio Meteorológico Nacional, NCEI, Deutscher Wetterdienst (extremes 1932–1993, sun 1961–1990) (Note: Station ID for Chihuahua is 76225 Use this station ID to locate the sunshine duration)
Source 2: Colegio de Postgraduados (snowy days, 1951–1980)

== Geography ==
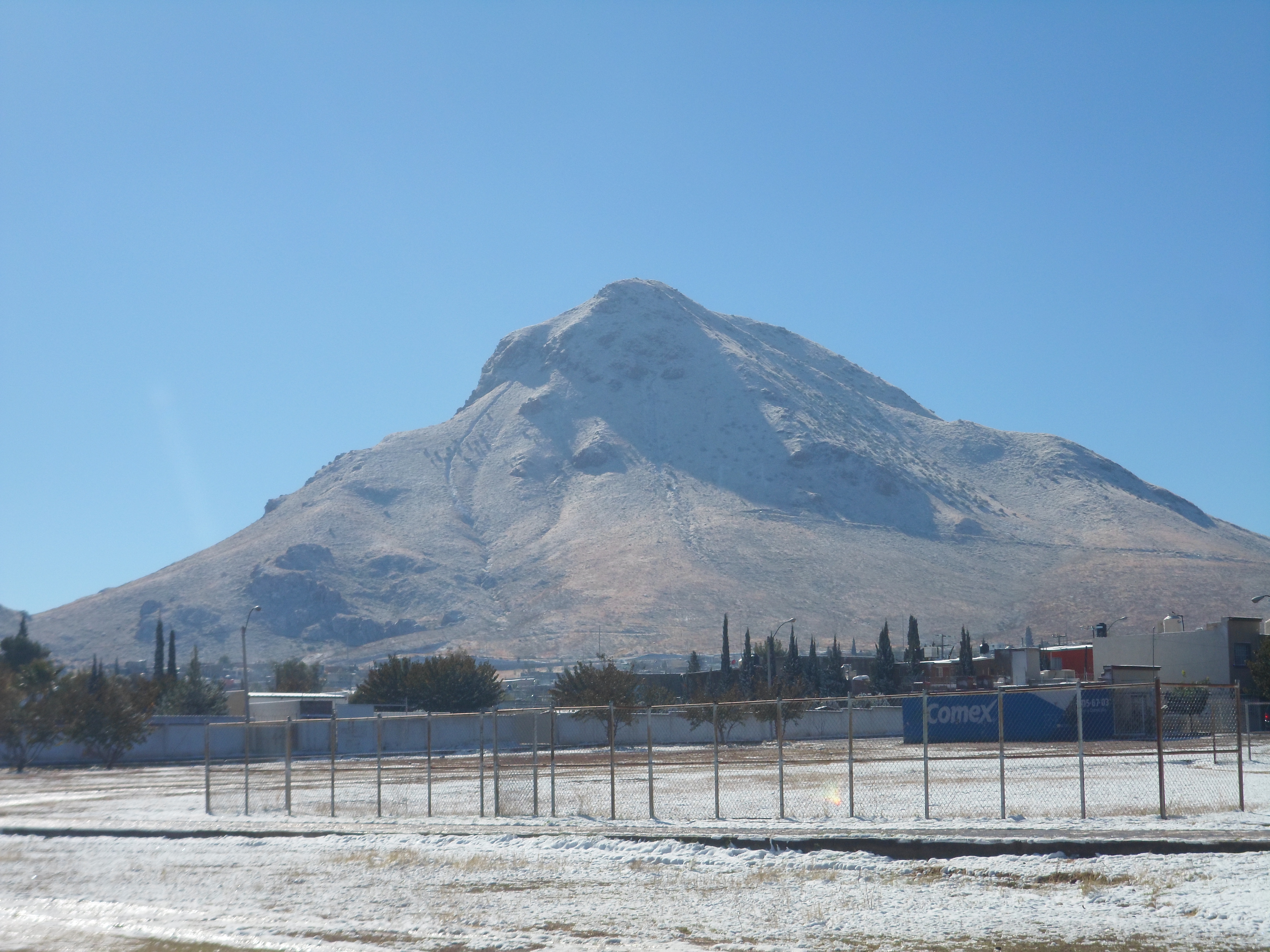
Cerro Grande (Big Mountain).

Chihuahua is best described as shaped as a large letter L, with plains to the north and hills on both sides, as well as the south; it is crossed east-and-west by Teofilo Borunda Avenue, which follows the natural flow of the Chuviscar River. Borunda is crossed in the west by the Periferico de la Juventud, a major limited-access highway running north-and-south. The main entrance to the city from the north (from the direction of Ciudad Juárez) is Tecnológico Avenue, part of the Pan-American Highway.

The geography of the city is dominated by three hills that appear in the coat of arms: Cerro Grande, Cerro Coronel and Santa Rosa, the last of which is fully covered by the city. The Cerro Grande has a monumental cross that is lighted each Christmas.

To the east and northeast, is the Sierra Nombre de Dios, across the Sacramento River from the city. Contained therein, off of Heroico Colegio Militar Ave, are the Nombre de Dios Caverns, a natural display of minerals and underground formations. To the far east and south is General Roberto Fierro Villalobos International Airport and the highway to the US-Mexican border crossing at Presidio, Texas and Ojinaga, Chihuahua.

== Transportation ==
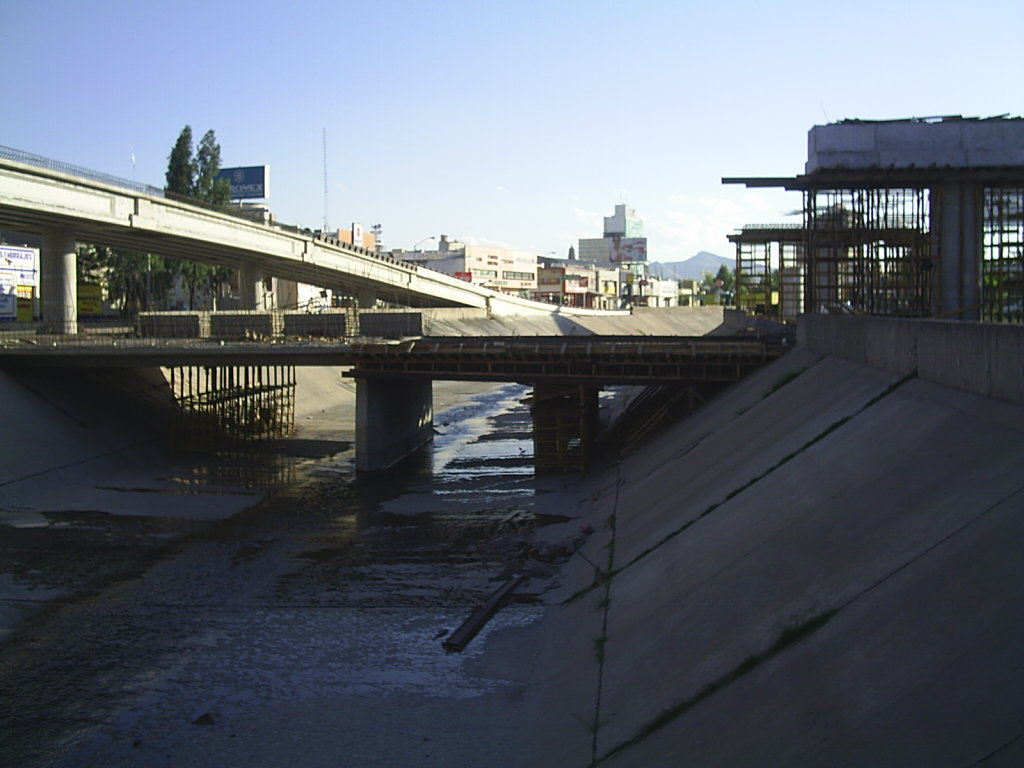
Bridges being built in the city, circa September 2005. The growing traffic in the city caused a massive construction plan for more and better roads.

Chihuahua is served by Roberto Fierro Villalobos International Airport (IATA Airport code: CUU) with connections to major Mexican cities and international destinations to Denver, Dallas, Houston, and Phoenix (Dec 2019). The airport serves as the state's largest in both cargo volume and passengers and is currently being expanded accordingly.

Chihuahua is also the starting point for the Chihuahua–Pacific Railroad with a terminus in Los Mochis, Sinaloa, and is also served by Ferromex, a private Mexican railroad. There is a large central depot for intercity buses in the south side of the city serving as a hub for the county's main bus companies as well as regional, state, and international bus companies.

Preceding station	Ferromex	Following station
Cuauhtémoc toward Los Mochis	Chepe Regional	Terminus
Former services
Preceding station	N de M	Following station
Salas toward Topolobampo	Ferrocarril Chihuahua al Pacífico	Tabalaopa toward Ojinaga

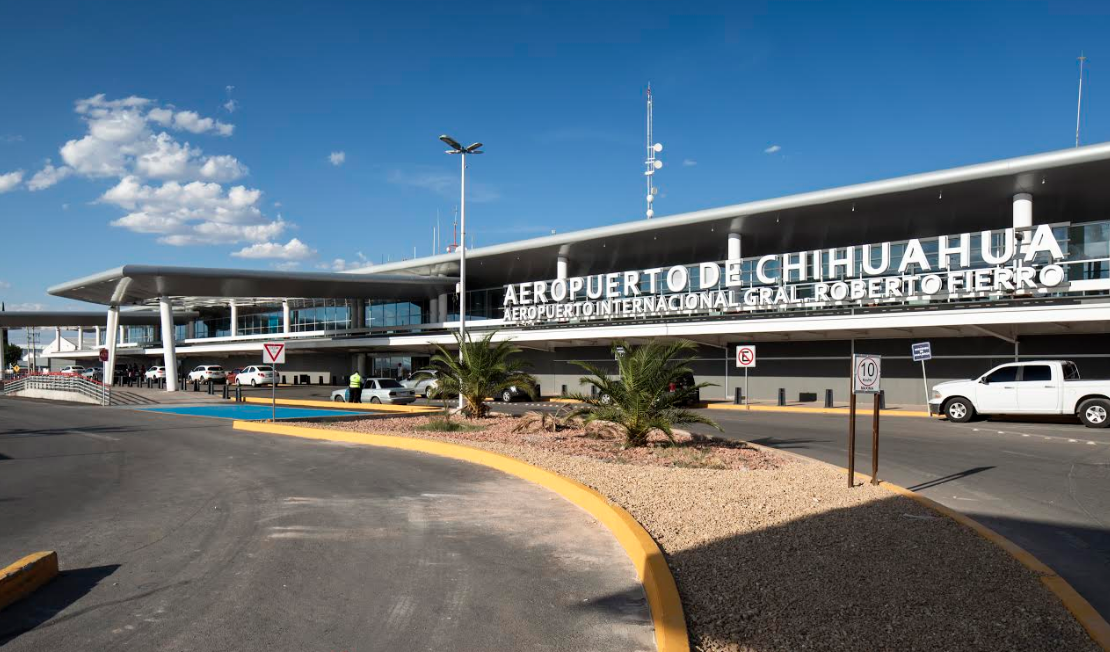
Roberto Fierro Villalobos International Airport.

The city has established a BRT bus rapid-transit system known as Bowí Chihuhaua, which currently serves the city with 1 line running 12.7 miles and 44 stations as well as dozens supplementary lines that extend into suburbs. The city's government, in cooperation with the Secretariat of Communications and Transportation, has started construction for two more central bus lines running the length of the Periférico de la Juventud and the Avenida 20 de Noviembre/Avenida Flores Magon, with several more stations that will be completed in 2019. Metrobus Chihuahua payment has been upgraded to be charged electronically through special swipe cards sold at each station. In 2018, the city government announced plans to provide free Wifi to all 44 stations, as part of an initiative to make Internet access more equitable.

The system of avenues and main streets in the city is being constantly revamped, with the construction of new roads and bridges to handle the ever-increasing traffic. Alongside numerous taxi companies, Chihuahua is host to both Uber and DiDi, private on-demand ride-sharing car services.

Important highways that run through Chihuahua are Highway 45, which connects Chihuahua to Ciudad Juárez to the north and Delicias to the south, and highway 16, which connects Chihuahua to Hermosillo to the west and to the border town of Ojinaga to the east.

== Crime ==
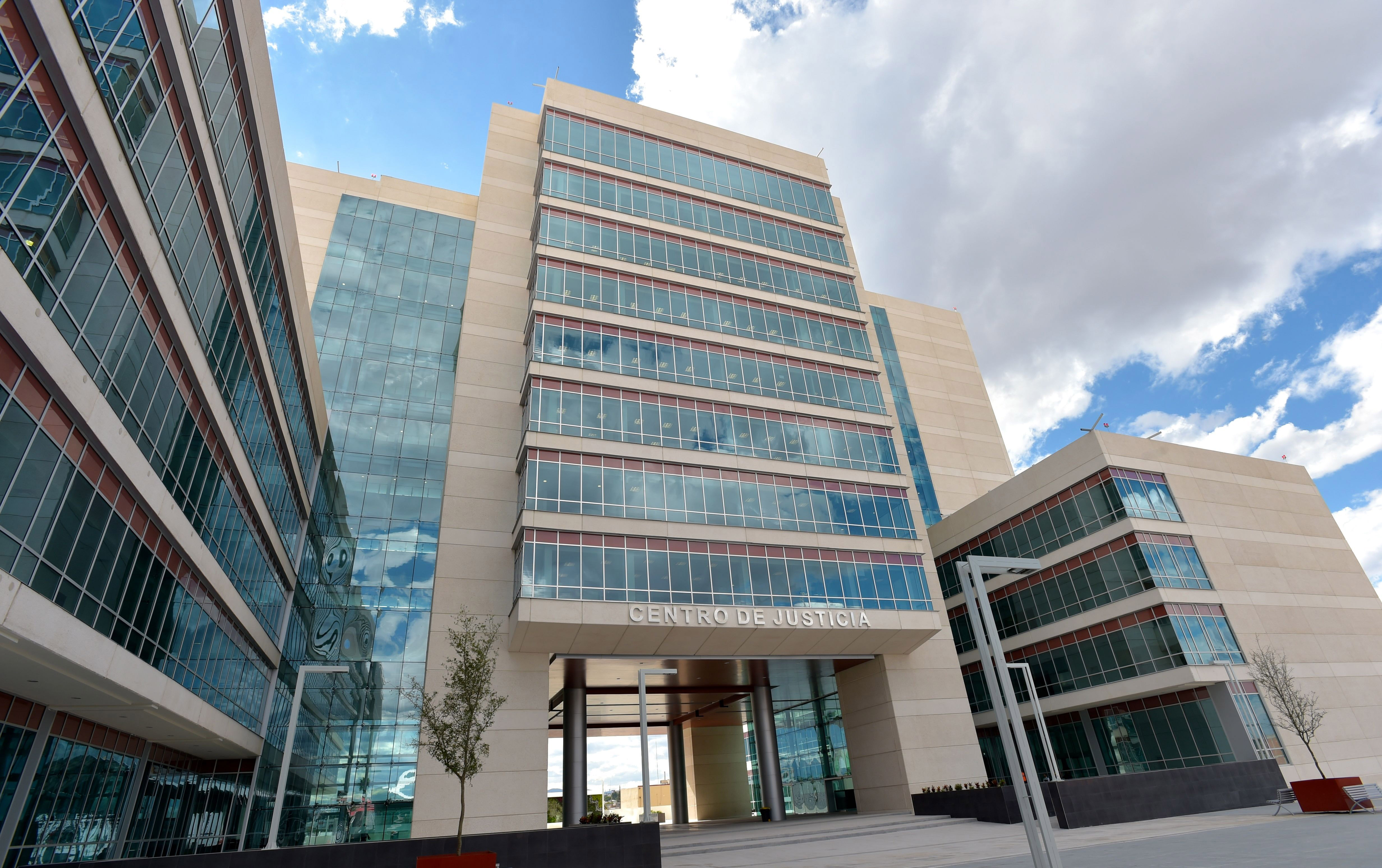
The Centro de Justicia was inaugurated in 2015, it turned out to be the largest seat of judicial power in Latin America.

The city had a serious problem with property crime, especially theft and graffiti by taggers. Also, drug-related murders, including murders of law-enforcement officers (38 in 2007 according to a March 2008 issue of the newspaper Diario de Chihuahua) by traffickers led by Joaquín Guzmán Loera ("el Chapo", or "Shorty"), have been on the rise. The federal police and the army have moved into the city to conduct anti-drug operations; it seems that their activity may have a positive effect; the indices of property crime and murder have fallen since 2010, with the result that Chihuahua is safer now than in years past.

== Sports ==
The city is home of the Dorados de Chihuahua of the Liga Nacional de Baloncesto Profesional, or National Professional Basketball League of Mexico. The city formerly had a baseball franchise in the Mexican League (AAA), also known as the Dorados.

On May 15 and 16, 2010 the city also hosted the 24th IAAF World Race Walking Cup with $122,500 in prize money awarded in the team and individual competitions to the world's fastest walkers at distances ranging from 20 to 50 kilometers (12–31 mi), plus a 10 km (6.2 miles) race for juniors, aged 16 to 19 years of age.

In 2019, the team Caudillos de Chihuahua was founded to play in the New American Football League of Mexico named Fútbol Americano de México. The team plays in the Olympic Stadium of Chihuahua.

The city also hosts the Chihuahua Savage, a team in the United States-based Major Arena Soccer League. The team was founded in 2019 and originally played in the minor league Major Arena Soccer League 2.

== Tourism ==
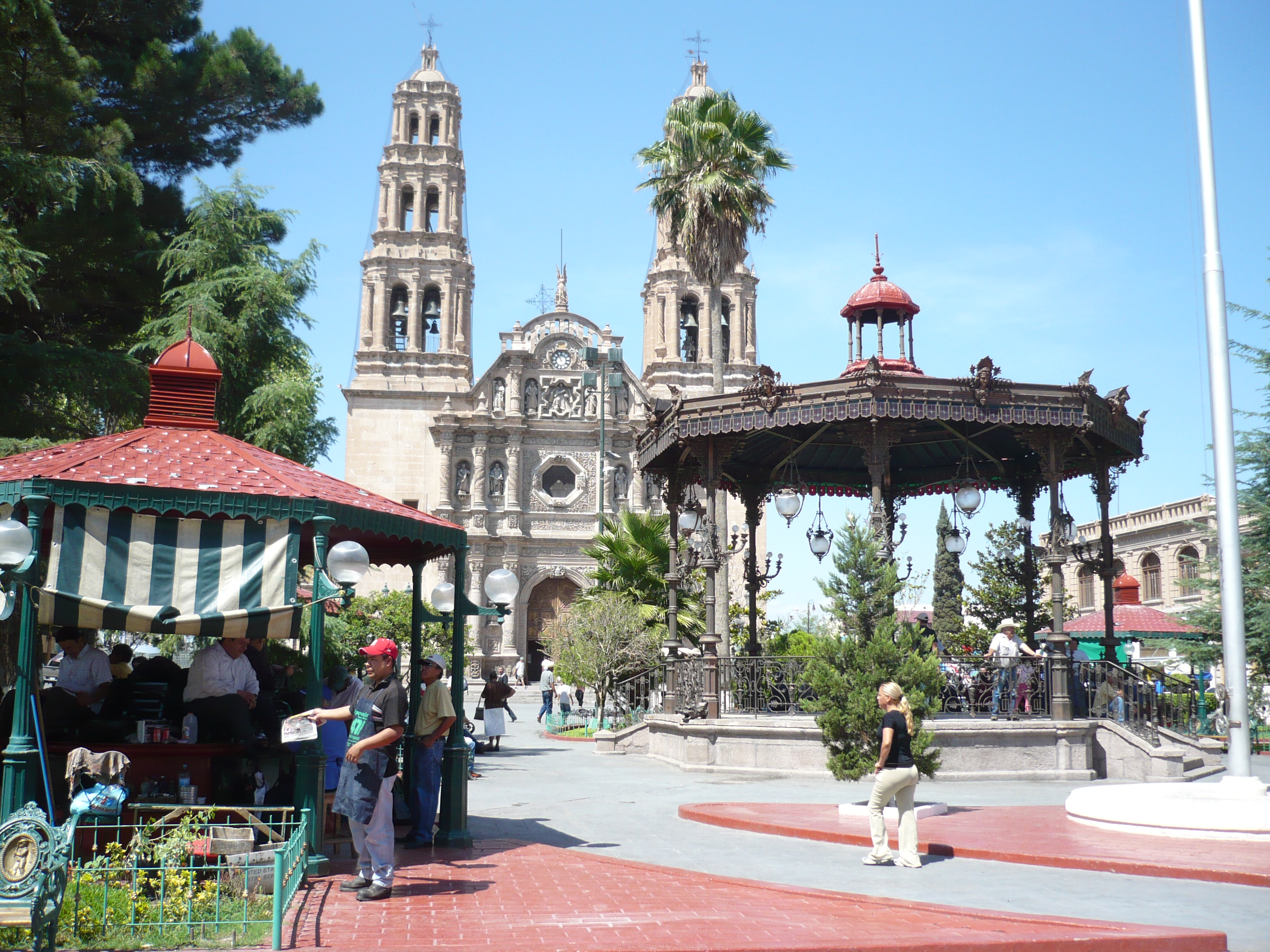
The Cathedral occupies the west side of the Plaza de Armas

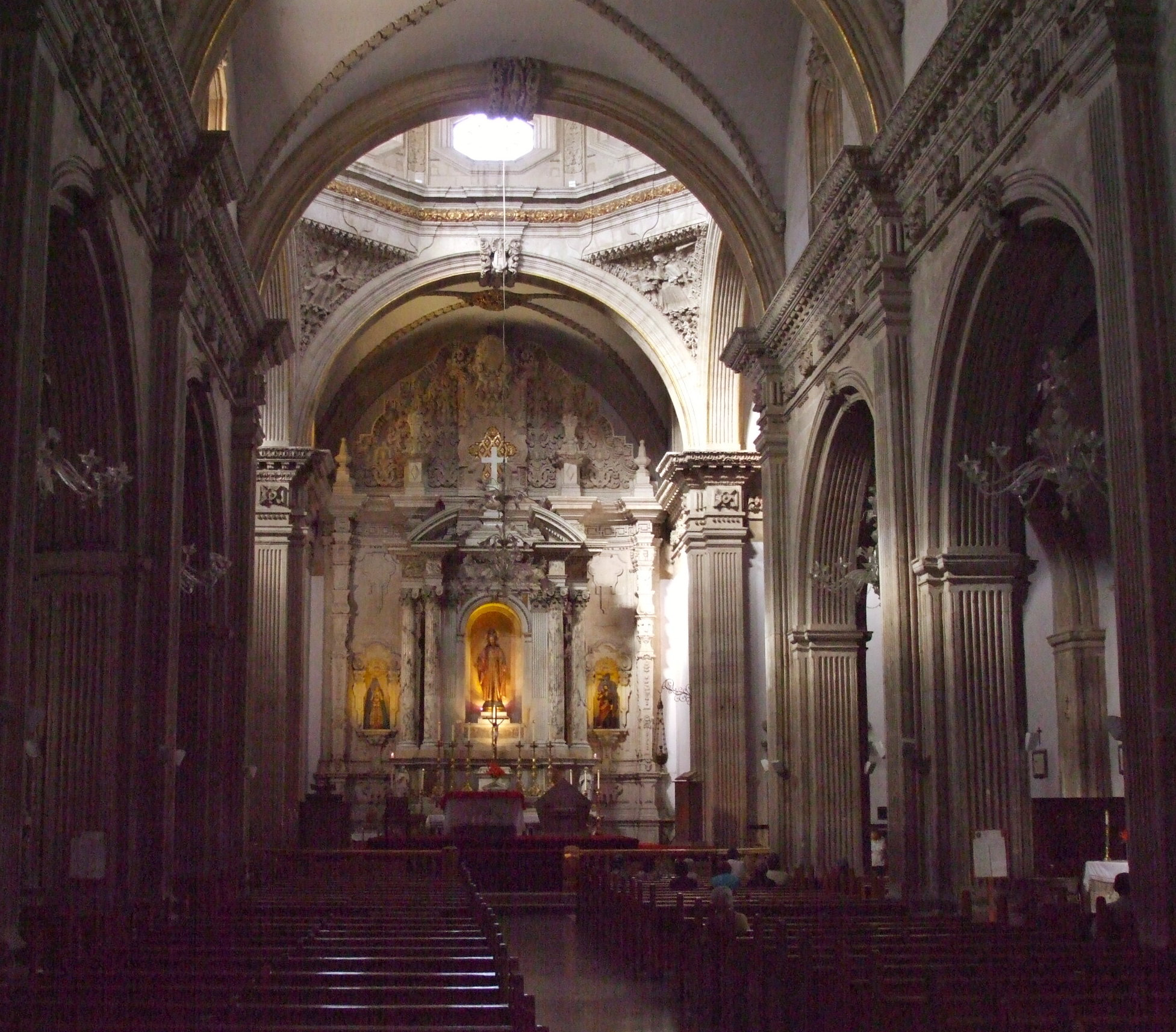
Interior of the cathedral

The city of Chihuahua has a number of tourist sites, including the museums in Chihuahua, the baroque Metropolitan Cathedral, seat of the Archdiocese (and the resting place of St Peter of Jesus Maldonado, a Cristero martyr of the 1930s), dating from the 18th century, the Government Palace from the early 19th century, and the City Hall from the turn of the 20th century, on the Plaza de Armas across from the cathedral.

During the French invasion and the Second Empire, which ended with the execution of the Habsburg Emperor Maximilian in 1867, the constitutional president, Benito Juárez García traveled the country, searching for support wherever he could. He found it in 1864 when he settled his cabinet and government-in-exile here in the city at the address now known as Ave. Juárez 321, and incidentally, making Chihuahua the only city, aside from Mexico City, to be the capital of the Republic. The Museo Casa Juarez, now known as The Museum of Republican Loyalty, has been faithfully restored to the appearance it had when President Juárez lived here from 1864 through 1866.

The city offers the service of the touristic "Trolley el Tarahumara" which is a tourist bus that goes around to all the main museums and monuments in the downtown (starting its route at the Plaza de Armas), including parks like the Central Park "El Palomar", a large park that has a collection of sculptures, including one depicting three doves (palomas, hence the park's name) and a monumental flagpole, flying one of the largest flags in the Republic, as well as a statue of one of Chihuahua's favourite sons, actor Anthony Quinn, in his role as 'Zorba the Greek', as well as many others. The city is known for its classical and modern sculpture, as seen on any main boulevard or avenue. Included are works by Espino, Baltazar, Ponzanelli and Sebastian, the latter being a native of Chihuahua.

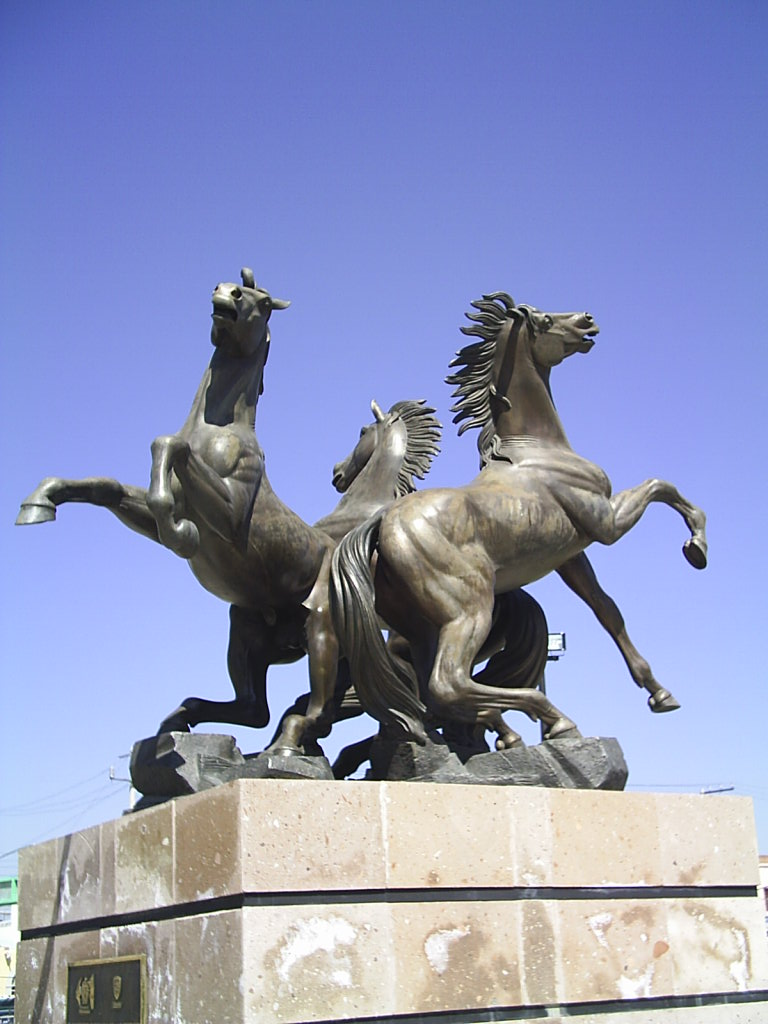
The sculpture "La Fuerza Indomita", by Carlos Espino in a park on Cuauhtemoc Street in the downtown.

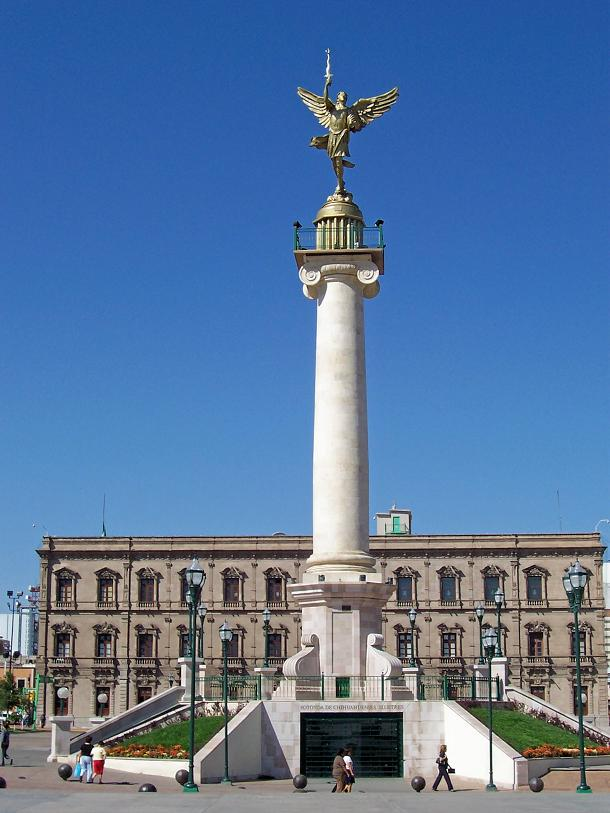
The Angel of Liberty with the Government Palace in background.

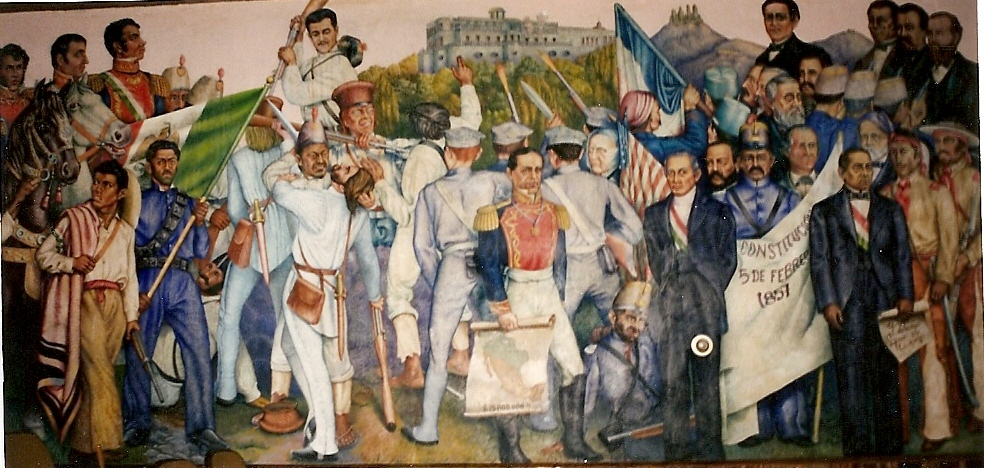
Panel from mural in the Paraninfo depicting the Mexican-American War (Artist: Leandro Carreón Nájera, 1937–39)

Particularly noteworthy are the murals in the Government Palace and the Paraninfo, or University Auditorium (in the Literary and Scientific Institute building) both depicting the history of the State of Chihuahua, and both fronting upon the Plaza Hidalgo in the downtown, and catter-cornered from the Plaza Mayor. Also of note is the Quinta Gameros, one of the largest estate houses in pre-revolutionary Chihuahua City, now the state museum for the decorative arts, and the former Federal Palace of Chihuahua on Venustiano Carranza Street, north of the Government Palace, which is now a museum and contains the cell in which Miguel Hidalgo spent his final days, and is a national shrine.

The Mammoth Museum, at Gomez Morin (also Calle 27a) and Ave. Juarez, is the city natural history museum and contains 13 halls detailing prehistoric life from the dinosaurs through the reign of the mammals, or the Cenozoic Era. It also has exhibits of prehistoric art. The Semilla Museo Centro de Ciencia y Tecnología, or Seed Centre Museum of Science and Technology, on Teofilo Borunda and Lisboa in the downtown, is a creative learning centre and interactive science museum for children.

The Feria (Fair) of Santa Rita, known throughout the Republic, is held during the last two weeks of May and features internationally known recording artists in concert. The fair has been held annually for decades. In addition, the university symphony performs at the Paraninfo weekly during the summer months, and features international guest artists in classical and pop concerts. The Plaza de Toros "La Esperanza", or bull ring, 'La Esperanza' is located on Teofilo Borunda on the north side of the river, and features corridas (bullfights) during the summer and fall.

The Plaza Mayor is an important square in the downtown that displays fountains, green spaces and a collection of monuments depicting local heroes. The main monument in the Plaza Mayor is the "Ángel de la Libertad" that was built in 2003 representing the freedom of all Mexicans, especially Chihuahua's people. It was inaugurated during the Independence Day festivities on September 15 of that same year. The angel has a sword with a laser light at the tip, and is capable of rotating 360° over its axis.

== Twin towns and sister cities ==
Chihuahua has two sister cities, as designated by Sister Cities International:

Country	City	State / District / Region / County	Ref.
USA	Albuquerque	New Mexico	
USA	Pueblo	Colorado	

== See also ==
- Mexico–United States border
