= City Hall of Chihuahua =

Coordinates: 28°38′12″N 106°04′35″W

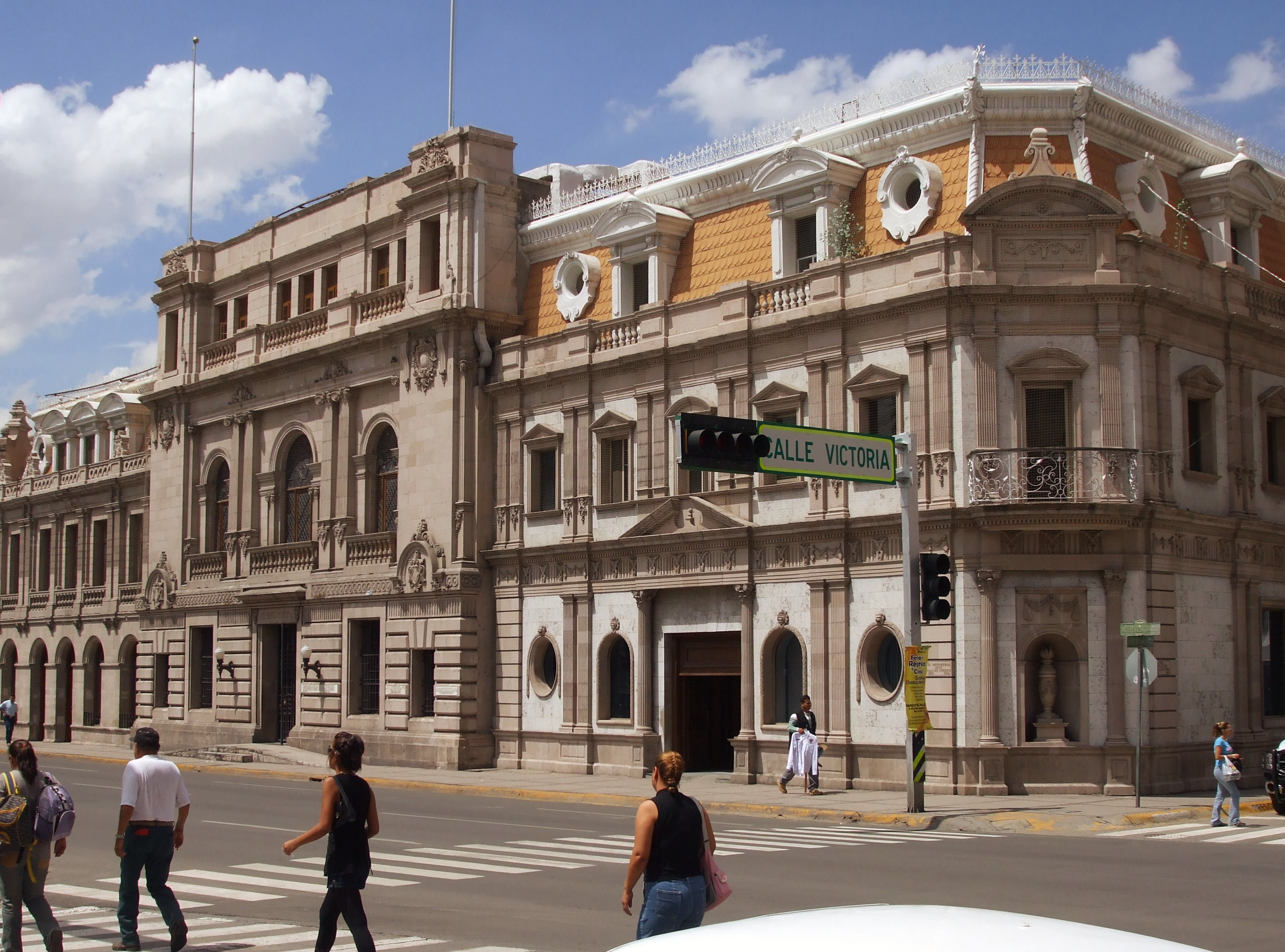
The City Hall

The City Hall of Chihuahua is an early 20th-century building in the city of Chihuahua, Chihuahua, Mexico. Located in front of the Plaza de Armas and the Cathedral, the City Hall houses the executive power of Chihuahua, the office of the mayor of Chihuahua, and the City Council whose salon is of special interest. The edifice is considered one of the main landmarks in the city centre.

== History ==
The building traces its origins to the construction of the so-called Royal House, built in 1721, that was designed to house the local authorities under royal Spanish rule. The building was popularly known as the Portals of the Municipality (Portales del Ayuntamiento). Eventually the colonial building was razed, and at the beginning of the 20th century construction was initiated on a new city office building.

The project was put under the charge of Architects John White and Alfredo Giles, and the building was officially inaugurated by Chihuahuas governor, Don Enrique Creel on October 4, 1907. Since then the building has housed the municipal offices of the city, and in 2005 it underwent a further reconstruction, the most visible change being the color of the decorations near the roof which were changed from green to light brown.

== Architecture ==
The building is a perfect example of the Mexican architecture that was erected during the presidency of Porfirio Díaz: Neoclassicism was influenced by French 'Beaux Artes' and European fashion at the turn of century. The building has two floors, the first with an available space for expositions and receptions.

Of interest is the salon of the City Council which is decorated in a grand, almost Olympian style with large mirrors and Corinthian columns, and containing three stained-glass windows, representing the history and economy of the municipality, and including the City Coat of Arms. Also of interest is the honorary seat for the permanent member of the council, President Benito Juárez, who lived here with his cabinet and government-in-exile during the French incursion, from 1864 through December, 1866, and was accorded this honour during his stay.

== Gallery ==
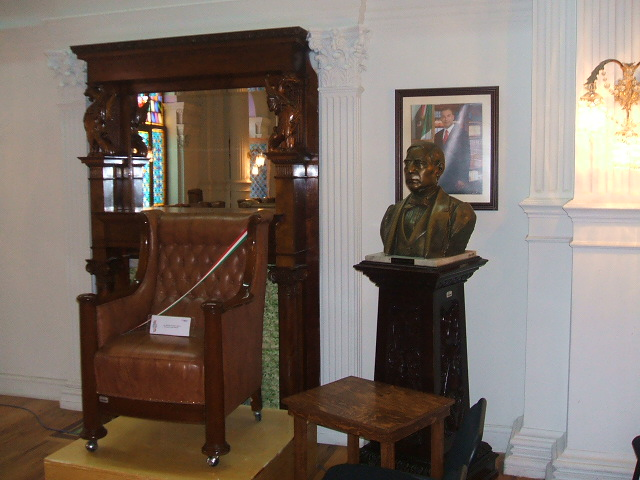
Honorary seat for the permanent member of the city council, President Benito Juarez.

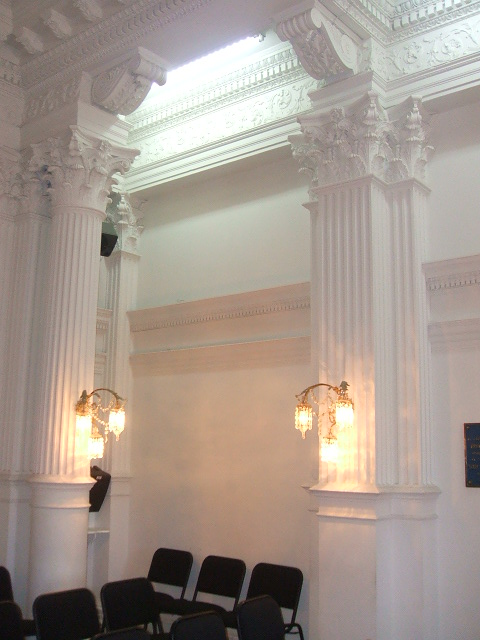
Corinthian columns in the City Council salon.

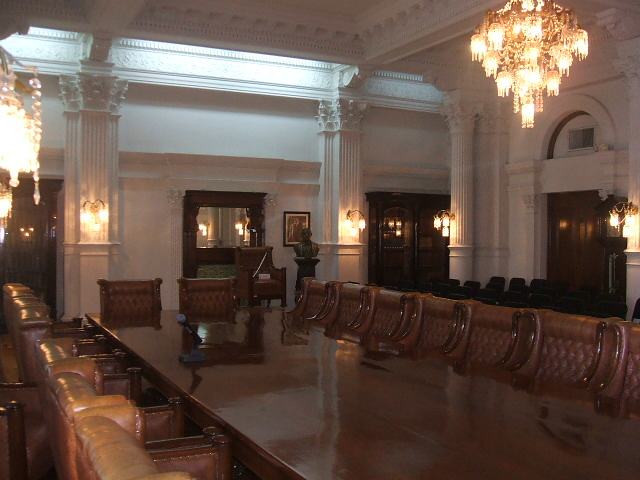
Another view of the salon showing the Council Table.

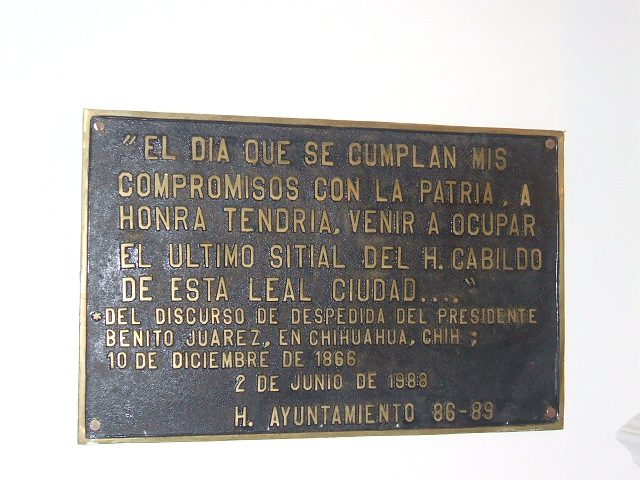
Plaque depicting a message by Juarez concerning his departure from 'this loyal city'.
