= Timeline of Chihuahua City =

Coordinates: 28.635278°N 106.088889°W

The following is a timeline of the history of the city of Chihuahua, Mexico.

== Prior to 20th century ==
- 1707 - Settlement founded by Francisco Munoz.
- 1709 - "San Francisco de Cuellar" community founded by Antonio de Deza y Ulloa.
- 1718 - Settlement named "San Felipe el Real de Chihuahua."
- 1717 - Church of Saint Francis of Assisi construction begins.
- 1721 - Royal House built.
- 1731 - Santa Rita Church built.
- 1763 - Population: nearly 5000.
- 1789 - Church of San Francisco building completed.
- 1791 - Population: 4,077.
- 1811 - Execution of Miguel Hidalgo y Costilla early in the Mexican War of Independence.
- 1821 - Population: 4,441.
- 1826
  - Church of Saint Francis of Assisi construction completed.
  - Guadalupe Church built.
- 1835 - Literary and Scientific Institute of Chihuahua founded.
- 1847
  - February 28: Battle of the Sacramento River occurs near town.
  - March: Town taken by United States forces under command of Alexander William Doniphan and Sterling Price.
- 1864 - Benito Juárez makes the town temporary capital of Mexico.
- 1882 - Paso del Norte-Chihuahua City railroad begins operating.
- 1891
  - Government Palace of Chihuahua built.
  - Catholic Diocese of Chihuahua established.
- 1895 - Population: 18,279.
- 1900 - Population: 30,405.

== 20th century ==
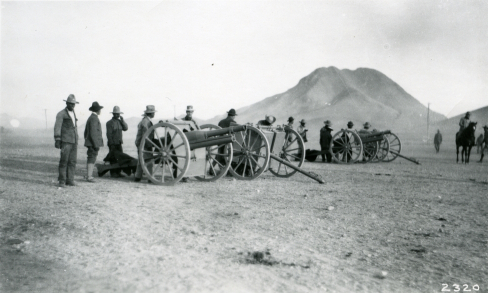
Troops of the División del Norte in their positions with cannon artillery, the photo was taken at a point northwest of the city of Chihuahua, the Cerro Grande rises prominently in the background.

- 1902 - El Correo de Chihuahua newspaper begins publication.
- 1905 - American Smelting and Refining Company facility built (approximate date).
- 1907
  - City Hall of Chihuahua built.
  - Francisco Villa Museum built.
- 1908 - March 1: Banco Minero robbed.
- 1910
  - Museo Casa Chihuahua (known as the Federal Palace) rebuilding completed.
  - Quinta Gameros mansion built.
- 1913 - Headquarters of Pancho Villa established in city.
- 1921 - Antonio Guizar y Valencia becomes Catholic bishop of Chihuahua.
- 1926 - Escuela Benito Juárez (school) active.
- 1927 - El Heraldo newspaper begins publication.
- 1947 - El Mexicano newspaper begins publication.
- 1948 - Chihuahua Institute of Technology established.
- 1949 - Del Real Hotel built.
- 1954 - University of Chihuahua established.
- 1961 - Ferrocarril Chihuahua al Pacífico (tourist railway) opened
- 1969 - Adalberto Almeida y Merino becomes Catholic archbishop of Chihuahua.
- 1972 - Museo Casa Juárez established.
- 1975 - Legislature building constructed.
- 1981 - Telmex Tower built.
- 1986 - July: Local election.
- 1990 - Catholic Pope John Paul II visits city.
- 1997 - Archivo Histórico del Instituto Chihuahuense de la Cultura established.
- 1998 - Gate to Chihuahua sculpture installed.
- 2000 - Punto Alto built.

== 21st century ==
- 2001 - Tribunales Federales building constructed.
- 2002 - Alejandro Cano Ricaud becomes municipal president.
- 2003 - Angel of Liberty monument erected.
- 2004 - Juan Blanco Zaldivar becomes municipal president.
- 2005 - International Festival of Chihuahua begins.
- 2006 - Museo Casa Chihuahua opens.
- 2008 - Nordam Mexico in business.
- 2010
  - June: Attack on Faith and Life Center.
  - Álvaro Madero Muñoz becomes municipal president, succeeded by Marco Adán Quezada Martínez.
  - Population: 809,232; metro 852,533.
- 2011 - Monument Tower built.
- 2012
  - Centro Cultural Bicentenario inaugurated.
  - Cenit Tower built.
- 2013 - July: Javier Garfio Pacheco elected municipal president.
- 2017 - March: Journalist Miroslava Breach Velducea is shot and killed by a gunman as she drives away from her home.

== See also ==
- Chihuahua history (city)
- List of municipal presidents of Chihuahua
- Chihuahua (state) history
  - History of Chihuahua state (in Spanish)

== Bibliography ==
=== In English ===
Published in the 19th century

- Alfred Ronald Conkling (1893), "Chihuahua", Appletons' Guide to Mexico, New York: D. Appleton & Company
- Henry Moore (1894), "Commercial Directory: Chihuahua", Railway Guide of the Republic of Mexico, Springfield, Ohio: Huben & Moore, OCLC 22498265
- Cristobal Hidalgo (1900), "Important Cities: Chihuahua", Guide to Mexico, San Francisco, California: Whitaker & Ray Co.

Published in the 20th century

- Reau Campbell (1909), "Chihuahua", Campbell's New Revised Complete Guide and Descriptive Book of Mexico, Chicago: Rogers & Smith Co., OCLC 1667015
- "Chihuahua (city)" . Encyclopædia Britannica. Vol. 6 (11th ed.). 1910. p. 134.
- W.H. Koebel, ed. (1921), "Mexico: Chief Towns: Chihuahua", Anglo-South American Handbook, vol. 1, New York: Macmillan, hdl:2027/mdp.39015027978728
- Ernst B. Filsinger (1922), "Mexico: Chihuahua", Commercial Travelers' Guide to Latin America, Washington, DC: Government Printing Office
- Robert Sandels (1971). "Silvestre Terrazas and the Old Regime in Chihuahua". The Americas. 28 (2). Academy of American Franciscan History: 191–205. doi:10.2307/980264. JSTOR 980264. S2CID 146982926.
- Mark Wasserman (1980). "The Social Origins of the 1910 Revolution in Chihuahua". Latin American Research Review. 15 (1). Latin American Studies Association: 15–38. doi:10.1017/S0023879100032520. JSTOR 2503092. S2CID 253154369.
- Daniel D. Arreola and James R. Curtis (1994), "Ciudad Chihuahua: Its Changing Morphology and Landscape", Yearbook, Conference of Latin Americanist Geographers, 20: 73–85, JSTOR 25765800
- "Central North Mexico: Chihuahua", Mexico, Lonely Planet, 1998, OL 8314651M (fulltext via OpenLibrary)
- "Northwest Mexico: Chihuahua", Mexico, Let's Go, Let's Go Publications, 1999, OL 10387112M (fulltext via OpenLibrary)
- John Fisher (1999), "Between the Sierras: Northeast Routes: Chihuahua", Mexico, Rough Guides (4th ed.), London, p. 132+, OL 24935876M
- Cheryl English Martin (2000). Governance and Society in Colonial Mexico: Chihuahua in the Eighteenth Century. Stanford University Press. ISBN 978-0-8047-4168-2.

Published in the 21st century

- Edwina Antonia Clark (2003). "Rails to Chihuahua: A Letter from Edwin Lyon Dean, September 22, 1882". Southwestern Historical Quarterly. 107 (1): 96–105. JSTOR 30239426.
- Thomas M. Fullerton Jr. and Luis Bernardo Torres Ruiz (2004). "Maquiladora Employment Dynamics in Chihuahua City, Mexico". Journal of Developing Areas. 38 (1): 1–17. doi:10.1353/jda.2005.0005. JSTOR 20066691. S2CID 153398337.

=== In Spanish ===
- Francisco R. Almada (1984). Guía histórica de la ciudad de Chihuahua [Historical Guide to Chihuahua City] (in Spanish). Gobierno del Estado de Chihuahua.
- Jorge Carrera Robles (1998). Crónica urbana: la ciudad de Chihuahua al inicio del nuevo milenio [Urban Chronicle: Chihuahua City to the new millennium] (in Spanish). Chihuahua, Chih., Ḿexico: Ayuntamiento Chihuahua.
- Carlos Lazcano Sahagún (2002). Chihuahua: historia de una ciudad (in Spanish). Editorial México Desconocido.
