= Thomas Fullerton =

Thomas Fullerton may refer to:

- Thomas B. Fullerton, American college football and college basketball coach
- Thomas M. Fullerton, American economist and academic
