= Diocese of Nuevo Casas Grandes =

Roman Catholic diocese in Mexico

Diocese of Nuevo Casas Grandes Dioecesis Neograndicasensis Diócesis de Nuevo Casas Grandes
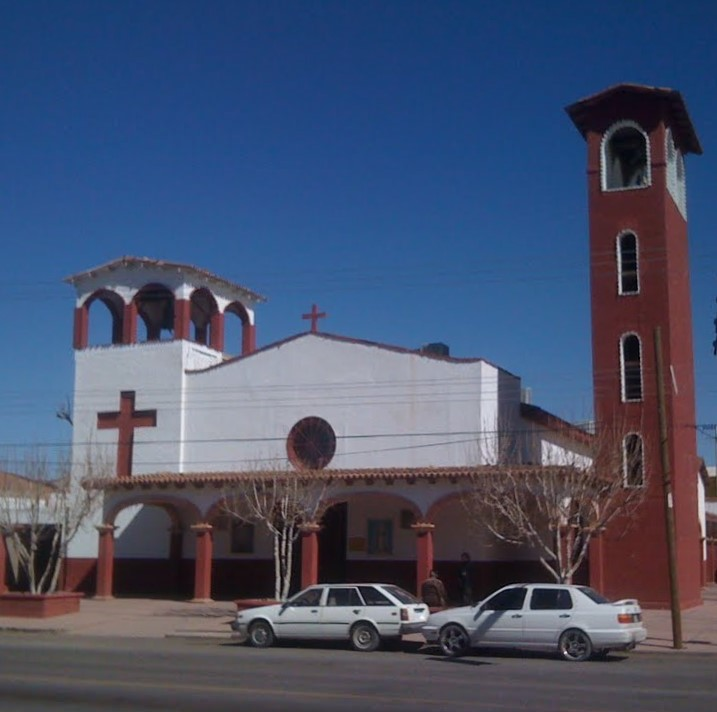

Location
- Country: Mexico
- Ecclesiastical province: Province of Chihuahua
- Metropolitan: Nuevo Casas Grandes

Statistics
- Area: 14,028 sq mi (36,330 km^{2})
- Population: Total; Catholics: (as of 2004); 143,991; 98,993 (68.7%)
- Parishes: 13

Information
- Denomination: Roman Catholic
- Rite: Roman Rite
- Established: 13 April 1977 (49 years ago)
- Cathedral: Cathedral of the Miraculous Medal

Current leadership
- Pope: Leo XIV
- Bishop: Víctor Melchor Quintana Quezada
- Metropolitan Archbishop: Constancio Miranda Weckmann

Map
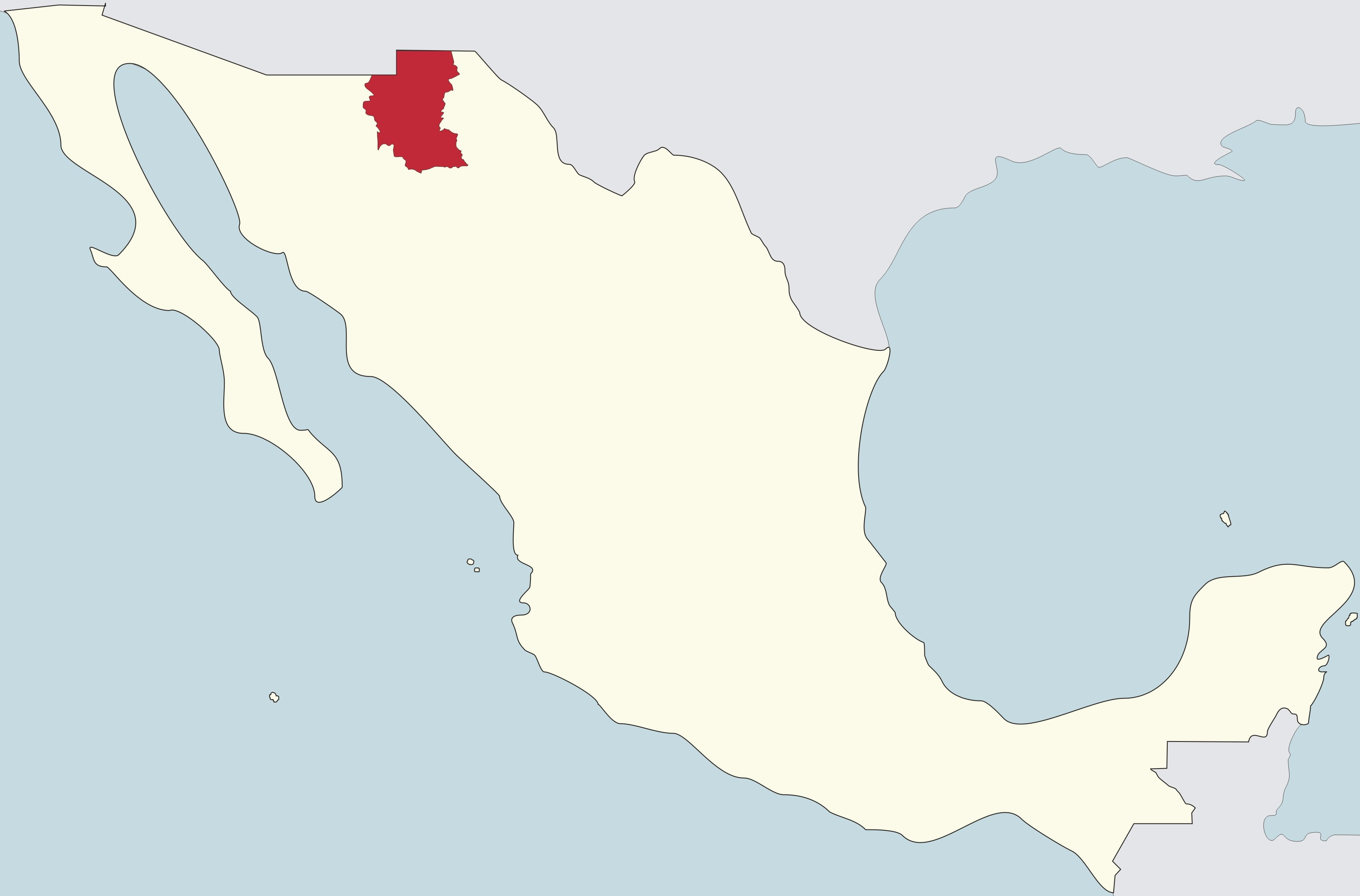

The Roman Catholic Diocese of Nuevo Casas Grandes (Latin: Dioecesis Neograndicasensis) is a suffragan diocese of the Archdiocese of Chihuahua, in Mexico. It was created as a territorial prelature in 1977 and elevated in 2000. It has an area of 36,320, a population of 149,000, a Catholic population of 130,000, 37 priests, and 45 religious.

== Ordinaries ==
(All Roman Rite)

=== Prelate of Nuevo Casas Grandes ===
- Hilario Chávez Joya, M.N.M. (1977 – 2000) see below

=== Bishops of Nuevo Casas Grandes ===
- Hilario Chávez Joya, M.N.M. (2000 – 2004), retired
- Gerardo de Jesús Rojas López (2004 – 2010), appointed Bishop of Tabasco
- Jesús José Herrera Quiñonez (2011 – 2023), appointed Bishop of Culiacán, Sinaloa
- Víctor Melchor Quintana Quezada (2025 – Present)

== Episcopal See ==
- Nuevo Casas Grandes, Chihuahua

== External links and references ==
- "Diocese of Nuevo Casas Grandes". Catholic-Hierarchy.
