= Roman Catholic Archdiocese of Tulancingo =

Latin Catholic archdiocese in Mexico

Coordinates: 20°04′49.53″N 98°22′8.95″W

Archdiocese of Tulancingo Archidioecesis Tulancingensis Arquidiócesis de Tulancingo
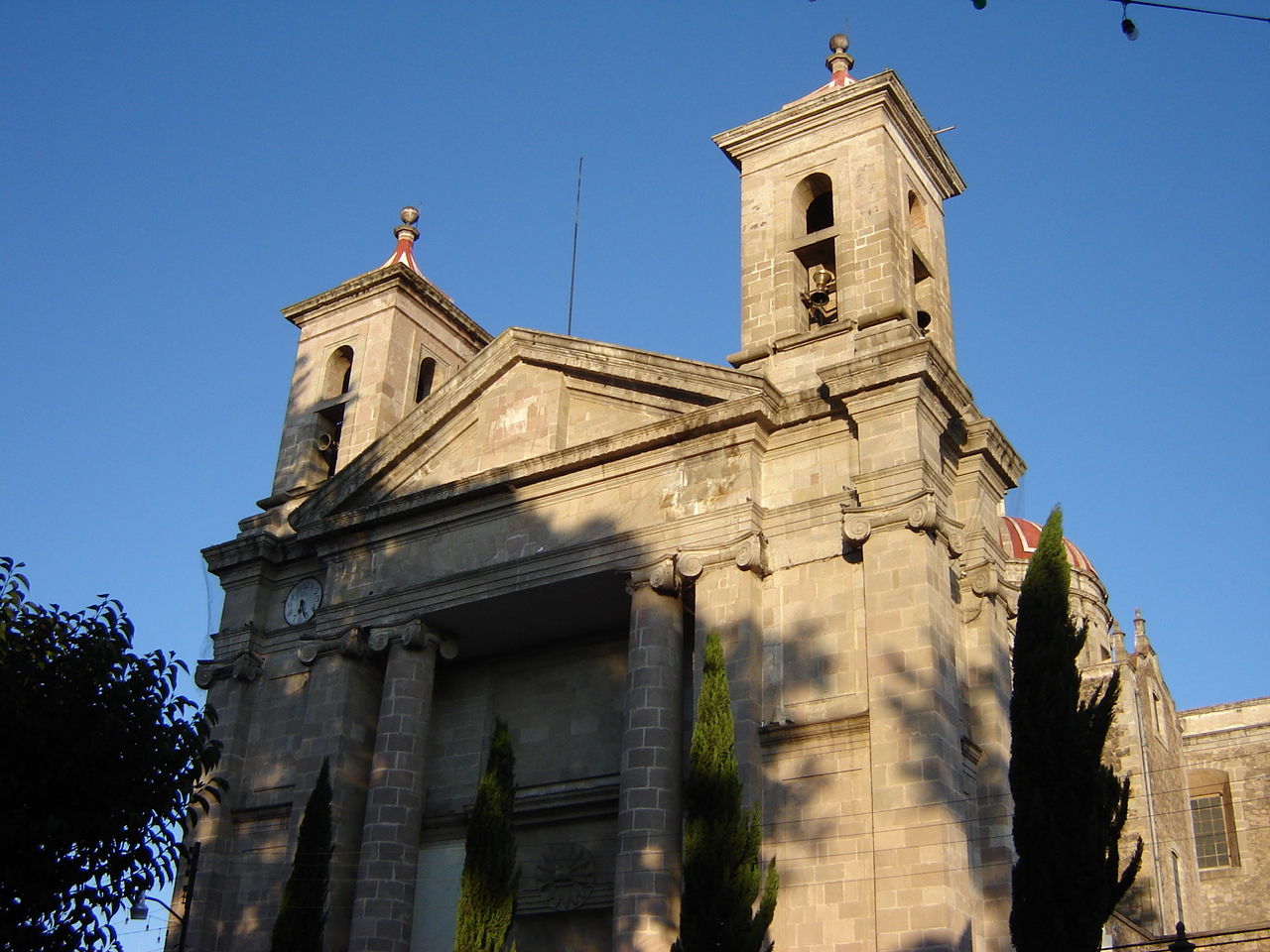
- Cathedral of St. John the Baptist

- Coat of arms

Location
- Country: Mexico
- Ecclesiastical province: Province of Tulancingo
- Metropolitan: Tulancingo

Statistics
- Area: 4,131 sq mi (10,700 km^{2})
- Population: Total; Catholics: (as of 2010); 1,607,000; 1,480,845 (92.1%)
- Parishes: 84

Information
- Denomination: Catholic Church
- Rite: Roman Rite
- Established: 26 January 1863 (162 years ago)
- Cathedral: Cathedral of St. John the Baptist

Current leadership
- Pope: Leo XIV
- Archbishop: Oscar Roberto Domínguez Couttolenc
- Bishops emeritus: Domingo Díaz Martínez

Map

The Archdiocese of Tulancingo (Latin: Archidioecesis Tulancingensis) is an archdiocese of the Latin Church of the Catholic Church in Mexico. The Archdiocese comprises the province of Hidalgo, and the archiepiscopal see is located in the Mexican city of Tulancingo.

As a Metropolitan Archdiocese, it is responsible for the suffragan dioceses of Huejutla and Tula. It was elevated as an archdiocese on November 25, 2005.

== Leadership ==
The ordinaries and other prelates of the diocese, and later Archdiocese, have been as follows.

Ordinaries

- Juan Bautista de Ormeachea y Ernáez (1863–1884)
- Agustín de Jesús Torres y Hernandez, C.M. (1885–1889)
- José María Armas y Rosales (1891–1898)
- Maximiano Reynoso y del Corral (1898–1902)
- José Mora y del Rio (1901–1907)
- José Juan de Jésus Herrera y Piña (1907–1921)
- Vicente Castellanos y Núñez (1921–1932)
- Luis María Altamirano y Bulnes (1933–1937)
- Miguel Darío Miranda y Gómez (1937–1955)
- Adalberto Almeida y Merino (1956–1962)
- José Esaul Robles Jiménez (1962–1974)
- Pedro Aranda-Díaz Muñoz (1975–2008)
- Domingo Díaz Martínez (2008–2024)
- Oscar Roberto Domínguez Couttolenc (2024–present)

Auxiliary bishop

- Luis Benitez y Cabañas, S.J. (1926–1933)

Other priest of this diocese who became bishop

- José Fernández Arteaga, appointed Bishop of Apatzingán, Michoacán in 1974
