= Diocese of Tarahumara =

Roman Catholic diocese in Mexico

Diocese of Tarahumara Dioecesis Tarahumarensis Diócesis de Tarahumara
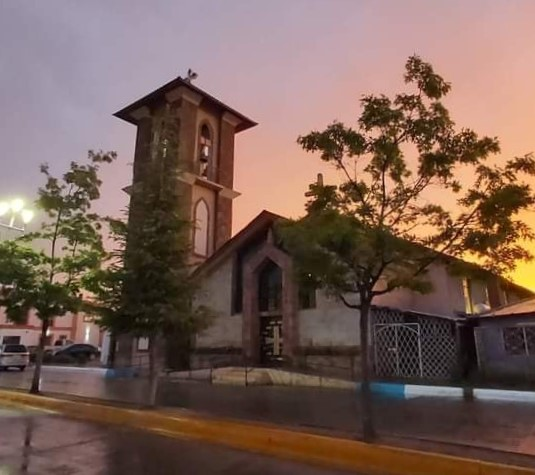

Location
- Country: Mexico
- Ecclesiastical province: Province of Chihuahua
- Metropolitan: Guachochi

Statistics
- Area: 12,110 sq mi (31,400 km^{2})
- Population: Total; Catholics: (as of 2010); 306,000; 296,000 (96.7%)
- Parishes: 15

Information
- Denomination: Roman Catholic
- Rite: Roman Rite
- Established: 23 June 1958 (67 years ago)
- Cathedral: Cathedral of Our Lady of Guadalupe
- Co-cathedral: Co-Cathedral of the Sweet Name of Mary

Current leadership
- Pope: Leo XIV
- Bishop: Juan Manuel González Sandoval, M.N.M.
- Metropolitan Archbishop: Constancio Miranda Weckmann

Map
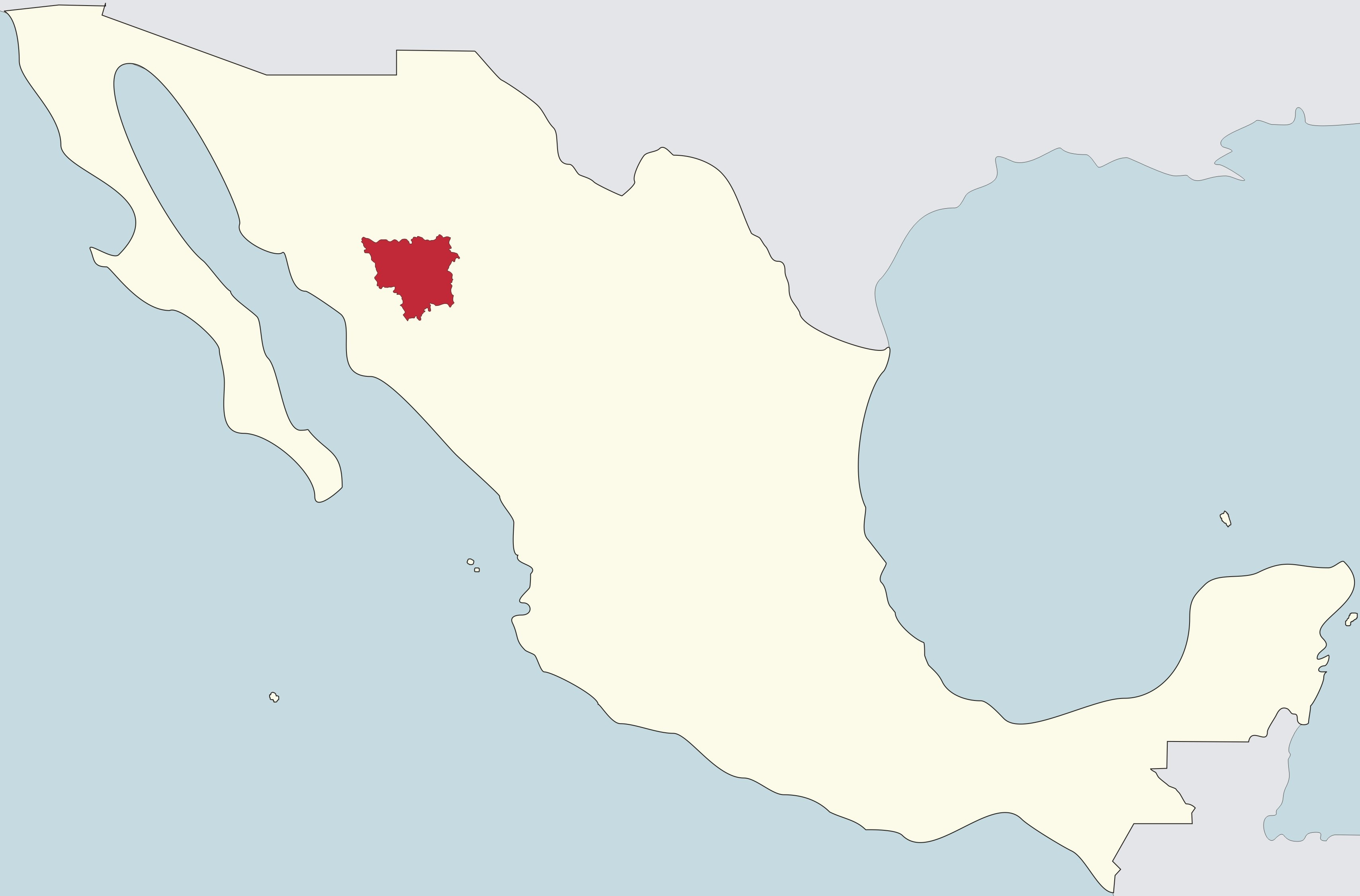

The Roman Catholic Diocese of Tarahumara (Latin: Dioecesis Tarahumarensis) is a suffragan diocese of the Archdiocese of Chihuahua. It was erected as a mission sui juris in 1950 and was elevated, first to a vicariate apostolic in 1958, then to a diocese in 1993.

== Ordinaries ==
(All Roman Rite)

=== Apostolic Vicars of Tarahumara ===
- Salvador Martinez Aguirre, S.J. (1958 – 1973), retired
- José Alberto Llaguno Farias, S.J. (1975 – 1992)

=== Bishops of Tarahumara ===
- José Luis Dibildox Martínez (1993 – 2003), appointed Bishop of Tampico, Tamaulipas
- Rafael Sandoval Sandoval, M.N.M. (2005 – 2015), appointed Bishop of Autlán, Jalisco
- Juan Manuel González Sandoval, M.N.M. (2017 – Present)

== Episcopal see ==
- Guachochi, Chihuahua

== External links and references ==
- "Diocese of Tarahumara". Catholic-Hierarchy.
