= Pedro Aranda-Díaz Muñoz =

Mexican Roman Catholic archbishop

- Archbishop of Tulancingo
- Church: Catholic Church
- In office: 2006–2008
- Predecessor: himself (as Bishop of Tulancingo)

Orders
- Ordination: October 28, 1956
- Consecration: June 24, 1975 by Miguel Darío Miranda y Gómez

Personal details
- Born: June 29, 1933 León, Mexico
- Died: November 11, 2018 (aged 85) Tulancingo, Mexico
- Coat of arms

Pedro Aranda-Díaz Muñoz (29 June 1933 – 11 November 2018) was a Mexican Catholic archbishop.

== Biography ==
Aranda-Díaz Muñoz was born in León, Guanajuato, and was ordained to the priesthood in 1956. He served as bishop of the Roman Catholic Archdiocese of Tulancingo in Mexico from 1975 to 2006 and then as archbishop of the Tulancingo Archdiocese from 2006 to 2008.
