= Hilario Chávez Joya =

Hilario Chávez Joya MNM
- Bishop of Nuevo Casas Grandes
- Church: Catholic Church
- Diocese: Diocese of Nuevo Casas Grandes
- In office: 13 April 1977 – 22 May 2004
- Predecessor: Prelature erected
- Successor: Gerardo de Jesús Rojas López
- Previous post: Titular Bishop of Crepedula (1977-1978)

Orders
- Ordination: 22 October 1950
- Consecration: 7 July 1977 by Mario Pio Gaspari

Personal details
- Born: 14 January 1928 Mexico City, Mexico
- Died: 4 March 2010 (aged 82) Santa Ana del Conde (northwest of Romita), Guanajuato, Mexico

Hilario Chávez Joya (22 January 1928 – 4 March 2010) was the Roman Catholic bishop of the Roman Catholic Diocese of Nuevo Casas Grandes, Mexico.

Ordained on 22 October 1950, Chávez Joya was appointed bishop of the territorial prelate of Nuevo Casas Grandes on 13 April 1978, and was ordained on 7 July 1978. He became the first bishop when the territorial prelate became a diocese on 3 June 2000, retiring on 22 May 2004.

He was known for his love for soccer and a few times he was seen playing with a football in the local seminary in Nuevo Casas Grandes.

He was found dead on his bed, due to diabetes, in a seminary in Leon, Guanajuato on 4 March 2010.
