= Roman Catholic Diocese of Parral =

Suffragan diocese of the Archdiocese of Chihuahua, Mexico

Diocese of Parral Dioecesis Parralensis Diócesis de Parral
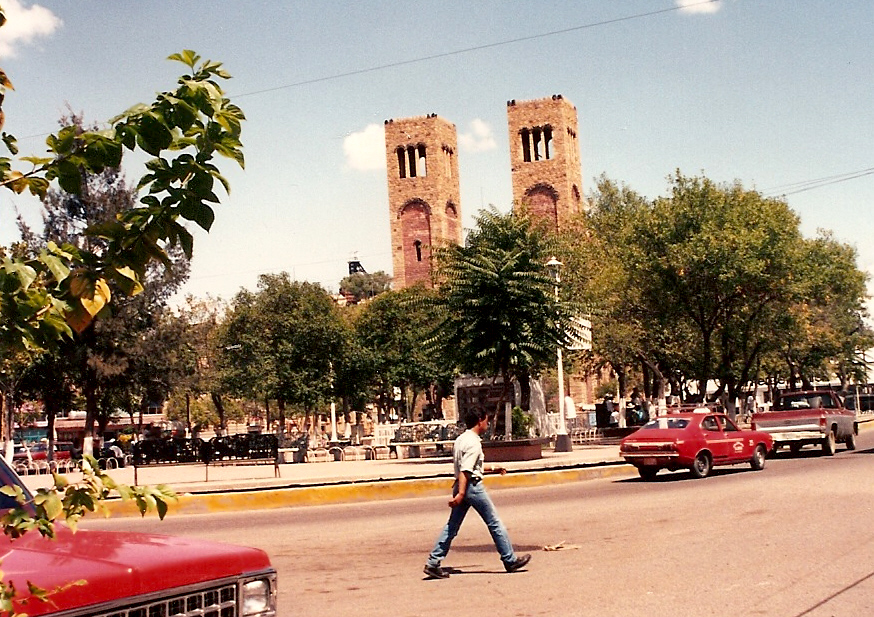
- Catedral de San José

Location
- Country: Mexico
- Ecclesiastical province: Province of Chihuahua
- Metropolitan: Parral, Chihuahua

Statistics
- Area: 16,872 sq mi (43,700 km^{2})
- Population: Total; Catholics: (as of 2003); 541,579; 515,790 (95.2%)
- Parishes: 17

Information
- Denomination: Roman Catholic
- Rite: Roman Rite
- Established: 11 March 1992 (33 years ago)
- Cathedral: Cathedral of St. Joseph

Current leadership
- Pope: Francis
- Bishop: vacant
- Metropolitan Archbishop: Constancio Miranda Weckmann

The Roman Catholic Diocese of Parral (Latin: Dioecesis Parralensis) is a suffragan diocese of the Archdiocese of Chihuahua, in Mexico. It was erected in 1992.

== Ordinaries ==
- José Andrés Corral Arredondo (1992 – 2011)
- Eduardo Cirilo Carmona Ortega, C.O.R.C. (2012 – 2019), appointed Coadjutor Bishop of Córdoba, Veracruz

== Episcopal See ==
- Parral, Chihuahua

== External links and references ==
- "Diocese of Parral". Catholic-Hierarchy.
