= Luis Mena Arroyo =

Mexican catholic bishop

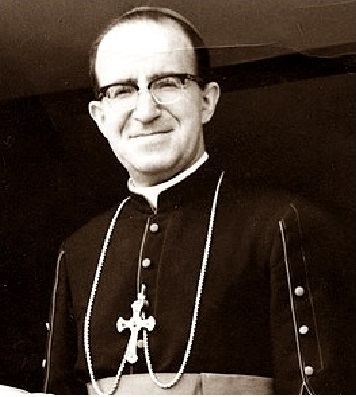
Luis Mena Arroyo

Luis Mena Arroyo (April 27, 1920 – March 3, 2009) was a Mexican auxiliary bishop of the Roman Catholic Archdiocese of Mexico from 1961 to 1964 and, with personal title of Archbishop, from 1979 until 1995. Between those stints, he was coadjutor archbishop in the archdiocese of Chihuahua, 1964–1969, but resigned without succeeding to that see. He remained archbishop and auxiliary bishop emeritus until his death in 2009 in Mexico City.
