= José Fernández Arteaga =

Mexican Roman Catholic Archbishop (1933–2021)

- Archbishop of Chihuahua
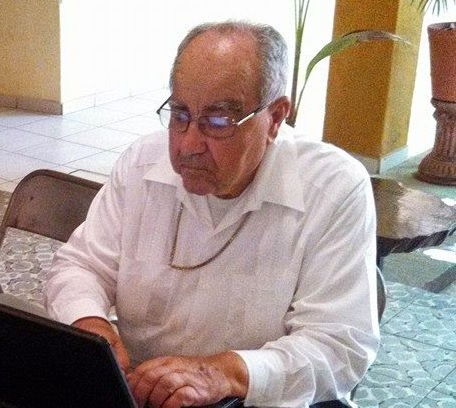
- Church: Catholic Church
- Installed: 1991
- Term ended: 2009
- Predecessor: Adalberto Almeida y Merino
- Successor: Constancio Miranda Weckmann
- Previous post(s): Bishop of Apatzingán (1974–1980); Bishop of Colima (1980–1988); Coadjutor Archbishop of Chihuahua (1988–1991)

Orders
- Ordination: 29 October 1988 by Edwin Byrne
- Consecration: 27 May 2016 by Mario Pio Gaspari

Personal details
- Born: 12 September 1933; Santa Inés, Michoacán, Mexico
- Died: 17 December 2021 (aged 88); Tocumbo, Michoacán, Mexico

José Fernández Arteaga (12 September 1933 – 17 December 2021) was a Mexican prelate of the Catholic Church who served as archbishop of Chihuahua. He previously served as the bishop of Apatzingán from 1974 to 1980 and Colima from 1980 to 1988.
