= José Andrés Corral Arredondo =

Roman Catholic bishop

- Bishop of Parral
- Church: Catholic Church
- Diocese: Diocese of Parral
- Installed: 11 July 1992
- Term ended: 24 December 2011
- Predecessor: Position Established
- Successor: Eduardo Cirilo Carmona Ortega
- Previous post: Titular Bishop of Cincari (1989-1992)

Orders
- Ordination: 22 November 1970
- Consecration: 22 February 1989 by Antonio López Aviña

Personal details
- Born: 30 November 1946 Colorades, Chihuahua, Mexico
- Died: 24 December 2011 (aged 65) Hidalgo de Parral, Chihuahua, Mexico

José Andrés Corral Arredondo (30 November 1946 – 24 December 2011) was the Roman Catholic bishop of the Roman Catholic Diocese of Parral, Mexico.

Ordained to the priesthood in 1970, he became bishop in 1989. He died of a heart attack on 24 December 2011, at the age of 65.
