= Miguel Darío Miranda y Gómez =

Mexican Catholic prelate (1895–1986)

His Eminence Miguel Darío Miranda
- Cardinal, Archbishop emeritus of Mexico
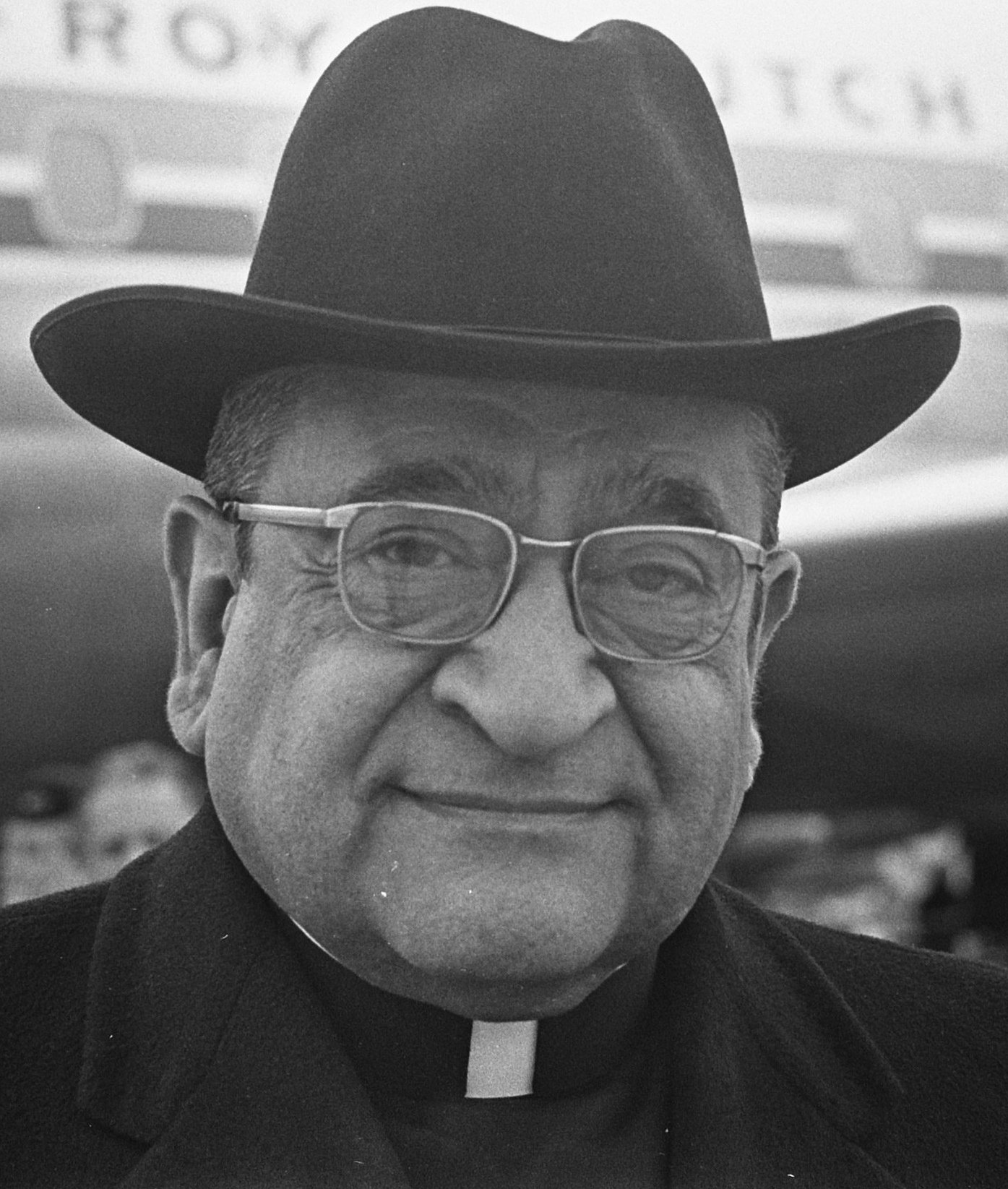
- Miguel Darío Miranda Gómez (1964)
- Archdiocese: Mexico
- Appointed: June 28, 1956
- Installed: January 26, 1938
- Term ended: July 19, 1977
- Predecessor: Luis María Martínez
- Successor: Ernesto Corripio y Ahumada
- Previous post: Archbishop of Tulancingo

Orders
- Ordination: October 28, 1918
- Consecration: December 8, 1937 by Leopoldo Ruiz y Flóres
- Created cardinal: April 28, 1969 by Paul VI
- Rank: Cardinal-Priest

Personal details
- Born: Miguel Darío Miranda y Gómez; December 19, 1895 León, Guanajuato
- Died: March 15, 1986 (aged 90) León, Guanajuato
- Buried: Mexico City Metropolitan Cathedral
- Denomination: Roman Catholic Church
- Residence: Mexico City, Mexico
- Education: Pontifical Gregorian University
- Coat of arms

Styles of Miguel Miranda y Gómez
- Reference style: His Eminence
- Spoken style: Your Eminence
- Informal style: Cardinal
- See: Mexico City

Miguel Darío Miranda y Gómez (December 19, 1895 – March 15, 1986) was a Mexican Cardinal of the Catholic Church. He served as Archbishop of Mexico City from 1956 to 1977, and was elevated to the cardinalate in 1969.

== Biography ==
Miguel Miranda y Gómez was born in León, Guanajuato, to Cipriano Miranda and his wife, María de las Nieves Gómez. After studying at the seminary in León and the Pontifical Gregorian University in Rome, he was ordained to the priesthood on October 28, 1918. Miranda then did pastoral work in León until 1925, and began teaching at its seminary in 1929. From 1925 to 1926, he was the Director of the National Social Secretariat. Under the religious persecutions enacted by Mexican President Plutarco Elías Calles, Miranda was imprisoned and later forced to leave the country from 1926 to 1929.

On October 1, 1937, Miranda was appointed Bishop of Tulancingo by Pope Pius XI. He received his episcopal consecration on the following December 8 from Archbishop Leopoldo Ruiz y Flóres, with Archbishop José Márquez Toriz and Bishop Maximino Ruiz y Flóres serving as co-consecrators, in the Shrine of Guadalupe. Miranda greeted Charles de Gaulle, at the Guadalupe Basilica for a Mass during a visit to Mexico in 1942. Miranda was advanced to Coadjutor Archbishop of Mexico City and Titular Archbishop of Selymbria on December 20, 1955. On the death of Luis Martínez y Rodríguez on 28 June 1956, he became his successor as Archbishop of Mexico City.

Miranda, who was a staunch advocate of social justice, attended the Second Vatican Council from 1962 to 1965 and served as President of the Latin American Episcopal Conference from 1958 to 1963. Pope Paul VI created the Mexican primate Cardinal Priest of Nostra Signora di Guadalupe a Monte Mario in the consistory of April 28, 1969. However, Miranda never had the opportunity of participating in a papal conclave, as he reached the age of 80 (the age limit for cardinal electors) on December 19, 1975. Before resigning as Mexico City's archbishop on July 19, 1977, he was the papal legate to the dedication of the Basilica of Our Lady of Guadalupe on October 12, 1976.

The Cardinal died in his native León at 90. He is buried in the Mexico City Metropolitan Cathedral.

Catholic Church titles
Preceded by Luis Altamirano y Bulnes	Bishop of Tulancingo; 1937–1955	Succeeded by Adalberto Almeida y Merino
Preceded by Ambrose Rayappan	— TITULAR — Bishop of Selymbria; 20 December 1955 – 28 June 1956	Succeeded by William Otterwell Brady
Preceded by Luis María Martínez y Rodríguez	Archbishop of Mexico City; 1956–1977	Succeeded by Ernesto Corripio y Ahumada
