= Adalberto Almeida y Merino =

Servant of God Adalberto Almeida y Merino
- Archbishop of Chihuahua
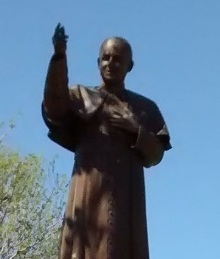
- Church: Roman Catholic Church
- Archdiocese: Chihuahua
- See: Chihuahua
- Appointed: 24 August 1969
- Installed: 8 September 1969
- Term ended: 24 June 1991
- Predecessor: Antonio Guízar y Valencia
- Successor: José Fernández Arteaga
- Other posts: Bishop of Tulancingo (1956–1962); Bishop of Zacatecas (1962–1969)

Orders
- Ordination: 24 April 1943 by Cardinal Luigi Traglia
- Consecration: 15 August 1956 by Antonio Guízar y Valencia
- Rank: Archbishop

Personal details
- Born: 6 June 1916 Bachíniva, Chihuahua, Mexico
- Died: 21 June 2008 (aged 92) Chihuahua, Mexico
- Buried: 23 June 2008; Metropolitan Cathedral of the Holy Cross, Our Lady of Regla, and of Saint Francis of Assisi, Chihuahua, Chihuahua, Mexico
- Parents: Luis Almeida Alderete and María Merino Sáenz
- Education: Seminario Arquidiocesano de Chihuahua; Seminario Conciliar Mayor de Durango; Seminarios Diocesanos de San Luis Potosi; Pontifical Gregorian University in Rome

Adalberto Almeida y Merino (Bachíniva, June 6, 1916 – Chihuahua, June 21, 2008) was a Mexican prelate of the Roman Catholic Church who served as Bishop of Tulancingo, 1956–1962; Bishop of Zacatecas, 1962–1969 and Archbishop of Chihuahua, 1969–1991.

== Early life ==
He was born on June 6, 1916, in the village of Bachíniva, Chihuahua, the son of Luis Almeida Alderete and María Merino Sáenz. He received his early schooling in his home village before entering the Conciliar Seminary of Chihuahua in 1930, motivated by his parish priest, Vicente Hurtado Saldaña, who had asked for his admittance to the then Bishop of Chihuahua Antonio Guízar y Valencia.

== Priesthood ==
He attended several seminaries: Chihuahua, Durango, San Luis Potosí y Veracruz. He also attended the Pontifical Gregorian University where he graduated in Philosophy, Dogmatic Theology and Canon Law. He was ordained on April 23, 1943, at the Church of the Gesu in Rome by Luigi Traglia. In 1946 he returned to Chihuahua where he taught at the Conciliar Seminary.

== Episcopate ==
On May 28, 1956, Almeida was appointed by Pope Pius XII Bishop of Tulancingo, succeeding Miguel Darío Miranda y Gómez (who in turn was appointed Archbishop of Mexico), and taking charge of one of the poorest bishoprics in Mexico at that time. He was consecrated bishop on August 14, 1956, by Guízar of Chihuahua, who had earlier been responsible for his admittance to the seminary. Pope John XXIII appointed him in 1962, just before convening the Second Vatican Council, as the ninth Bishop of Zacatecas. During his bishopric he attended all four sessions of the Second Vatican Council, and celebrated the centennial of the Diocese. On August 24, 1969, Pope Paul VI appointed him to succeed Guizar as second Archbishop of Chihuahua. Through his adaptation of the Social Christian Doctrine as elaborated by the Second Vatican Council, he actively evangelized the less fortunate members of society, and established the permanent Diaconate in the archdiocese. He is also noted as having increased substantially priestly vocations, the establishment of new religious orders, and the founding of new parishes within Chihuahua. He resigned in 1991, becoming Archbishop Emeritus on June 24 during the celebrations of the centennial of the erection of the Diocese.

== Later years ==
Almeida remained a beloved figure and active in the archdiocese after his retirement, celebrating daily Mass and ministering to the faithful until his death at age 92 on June 21, 2008. He is buried in the crypt of the Cathedral of Chihuahua.

Religious titles
Preceded by Miguel Darío Miranda y Gómez	Bishop of Tulancingo; 1956–1962	Succeeded by José Esaul Robles Jiménez
Preceded by Antonio López Aviña	Bishop of Zacatecas; 1962–1969	Succeeded by José Pablo Rovalo Azcué
Preceded by Antonio Guízar y Valencia	Archbishop of Chihuahua; 1969–1991	Succeeded by José Fernández Arteaga
