= Thomas B. Fullerton =

American football player and sports coach (1890–1952)

Biographical details
- Born: June 20, 1890; Ottawa, Illinois, U.S.
- Died: December 21, 1952 (aged 62); Abingdon, Virginia, U.S.

Playing career

Football
- 1913–1914: Illinois

Coaching career (HC unless noted)

Football
- 1915–1916: Emory and Henry
- 1920–1926: Emory and Henry
- 1926: Brevard

Basketball
- 1921–1922: Emory and Henry
- 1923–1930: Emory and Henry

Head coaching record
- Overall: 68–24 (basketball)

Thomas Bushnell "Bingo" Fullerton (June 20, 1890 – December 21, 1952) was an American college football and college basketball coach. He served as the head football coach at Emory and Henry College in Abingdon, Virginia from 1915 to 1916 and from 1920 to 1926. He also served as the school's head men's basketball coach from 1921 to 1930.
