= Museo Casa Chihuahua =

Coordinates: 28.6396°N 106.0739°W

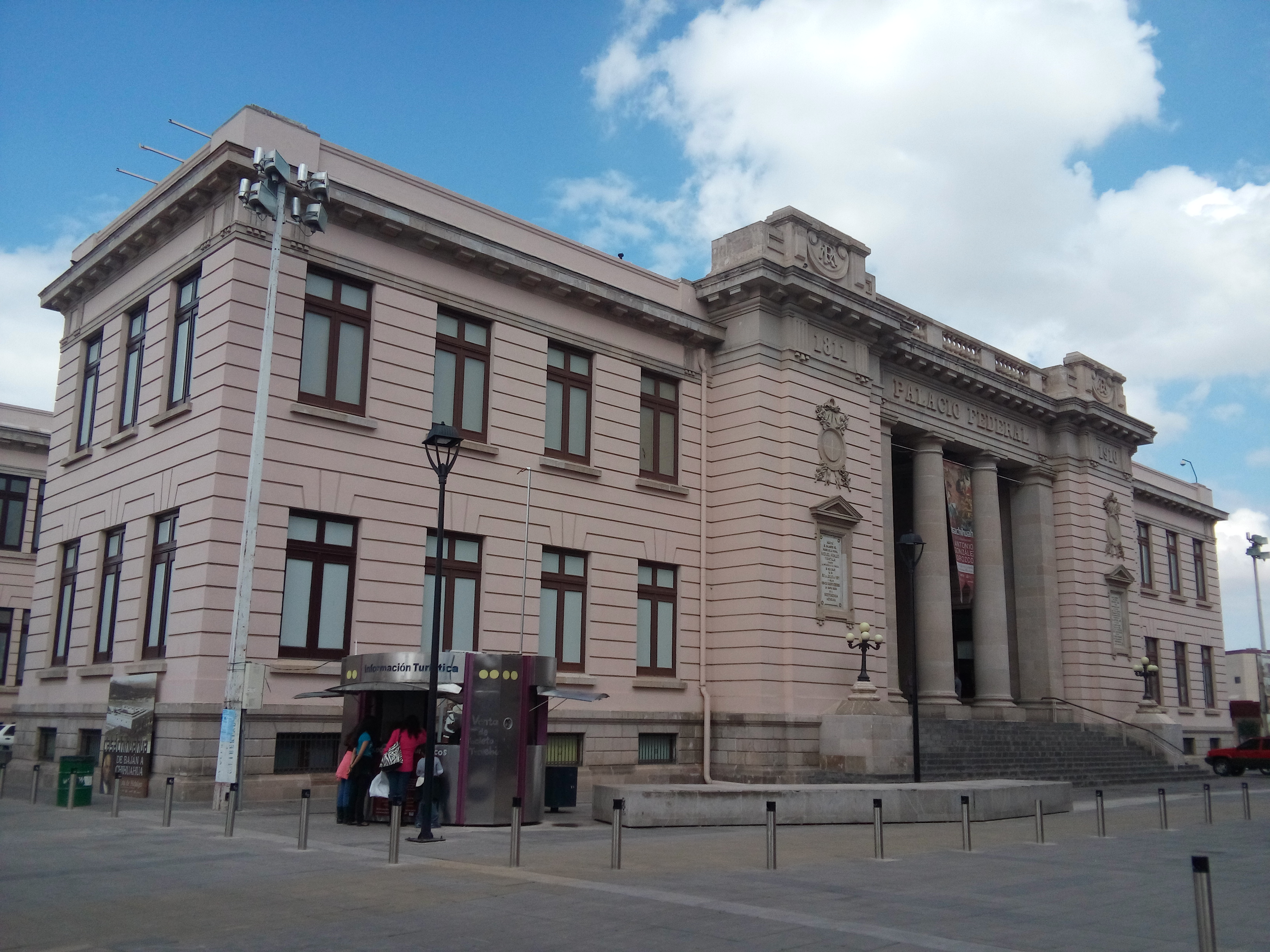
The 'Casa Chihuahua' Museum.

Casa Chihuahua Centro de Patrimonio Cultural (Casa Chihuahua Cultural Heritage Center), once known as the Federal Palace of Chihuahua, is an early 20th-century building in the city centre of Chihuahua, Chih., Mexico. It served as the federal building for the city until 2004, when it was renovated as a city museum, specialising in travelling exhibits. It also houses, in the basement, the jail cell of father Miguel Hidalgo y Costilla, considered the Father of the Nation. Father Hidalgo was the first leader of the insurgency for independence from Spain. He was captured by the Spaniards early in 1811, tried and executed on 30 July 1811 at the neighbouring Government Palace. His jail cell is a national shrine.

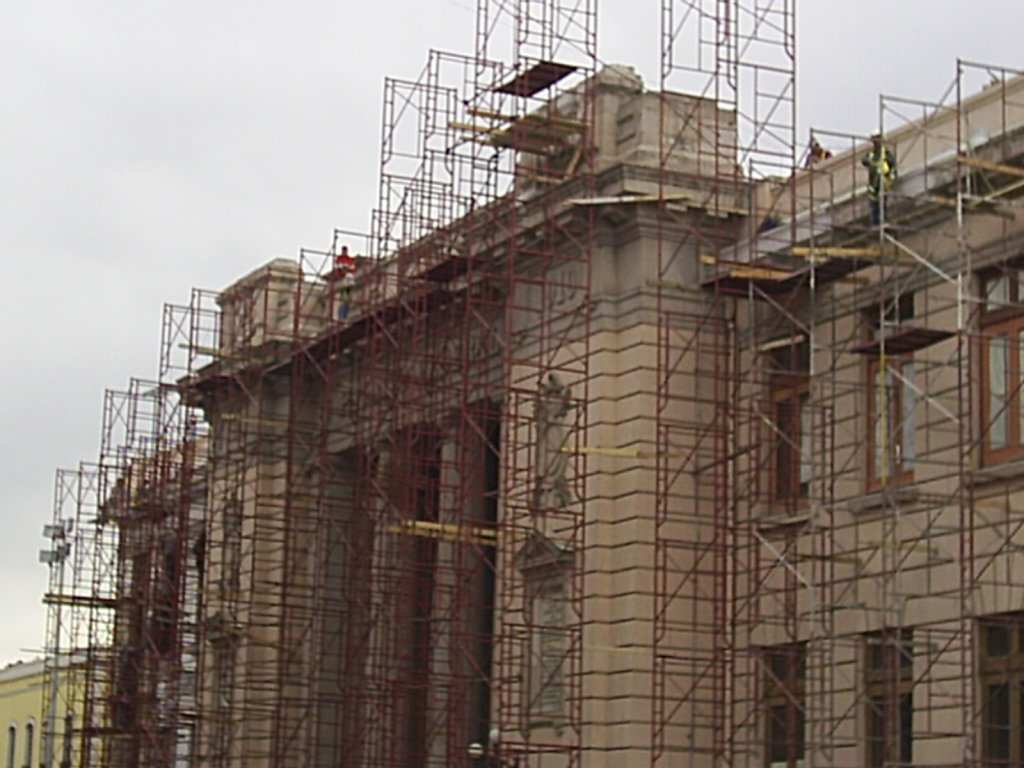
2004: During restoration.

== History ==
Originally, this site contained a college for the Jesuit order ("Colegio Jesuita de Nuestra Señora de Loreto", or Jesuit College of Our Lady of Loreto); however, in 1767 the Jesuits were expelled from all of the crown territories of Spain, following the orders of King Charles III, and the building was left abandoned. It later was converted into a 'Royal Military Hospital' and it was during this time that Fr Hidalgo was imprisoned there.

In 1878, the college was razed to the ground (except the tower in which Hidalgo was imprisoned, by decree of President Benito Juárez; it is now in the basement, but originally it was at ground level), and the Casa de Moneda, or branch mint was built here, where for some time Chihuahua minted and printed her own currency. In 1908 the Casa de Moneda was demolished in order to erect the Federal Palace that finally was inaugurated in 1910, during the celebrations of the centenary of Mexico's independence.

The Palace was built originally to concentrate all the offices of the Federal Government in the same place. During the revolution, Abraham Gonzalez, the deposed Governor of Chihuahua and political mentor of Pancho Villa was imprisoned there by order of the unconstitutional then-president and dictator Victoriano Huerta. He would eventually be murdered on Huerta's orders. The Palace also served as the main office of the Federal Postal Service (since it was a federal office) in Chihuahua.

In 2004 the postal service left the building and the palace was re-modeled in order to inaugurate a museum that would be called the Casa Chihuahua Centro de Patrimonio Cultural. It opened its doors again in 2006 and is today one of the most famous landmarks in the city, serving as a centre of culture in the city.

== Architecture ==
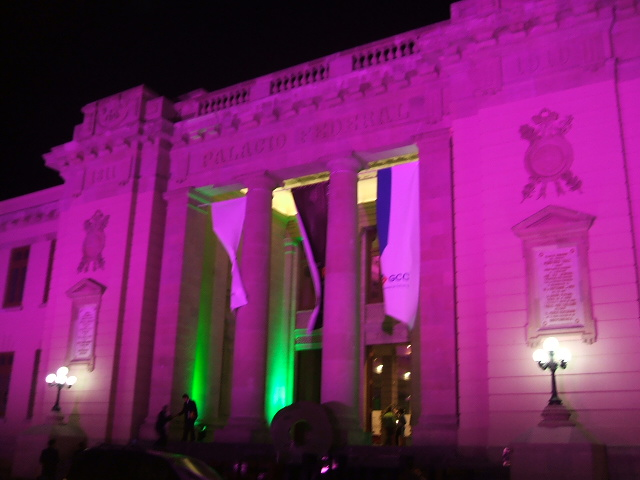
2007: Fully illuminated during the International Festival

The style of the building was popular during the era of President Porfirio Diaz, with both elements of neoclassicism and the French Beaux Artes. The main entrance of the palace displays two large columns and the walls have little decoration, typical of the neoclassical style.

The main facade exhibits the dates 1811 and 1910: The first is a reference to the death of Miguel Hidalgo, whilst the second refers to the time of the building's inauguration. The center contains the legend, Palacio Federal.

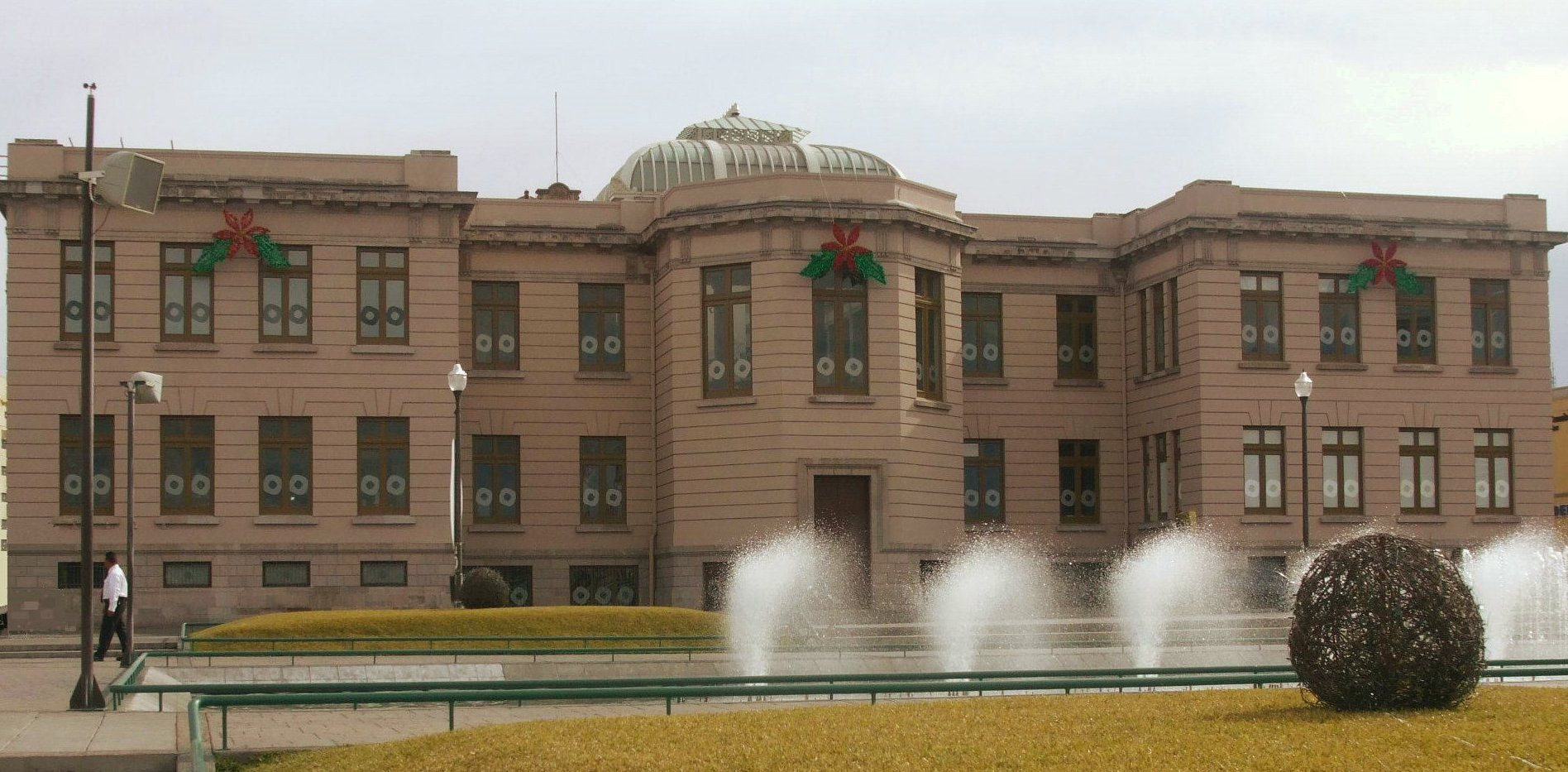
Rear facade of the museum with fountains.

== Exhibits ==
The museum is divided mainly into three areas:

- Museo de Sitio (Site Museum): This contains three rooms and is located in the basement of the building. It describes the history of the site, from the time of the college through the branch mint to the present museum. In this area is preserved Fr Hidalgos prison cell (in reality, it was never a prison cell or underground - it was one of the towers of the church of the Juseuit College, at ground level), and a videotape showing a re-creation of his last months of life is shown.
- Area de Exposiciones Temporales (Temporary Exhibit Area): This area, located on the first floor and the basement, is allocated to exhibits which change approximately every three months; it has had over 100 exhibits, dedicated to glass (from the Museum of Glass at Monterrey, Mexico), the history of Avalos (a former mining town on the outskirts of the city, now part of Chihuahua) and the Bank of Mexico's history of national currency and coinage, dating from the beginnings of New Spain to the present. A recent exhibit was dedicated to the life of Mother Teresa of Calcutta, and included relics and personal effects of the beloved nun.
- Museo Patrimonial del Estado de Chihuahua (Chihuahua State Heritage Museum): Intended to inform visitors about the attractions of the State of Chihuahua through images, videos and sounds, it is located in the upper floor and is divided into three zones: desierto (desert), llanura (plains) and sierra (mountains).
