= Archdiocese of Chihuahua =

Latin Catholic archdiocese in Mexico

Coordinates: 28.6359°N 106.0770°W

Archdiocese of Chihuahua Archidioecesis Chihuahuensis Arquidiócesis de Chihuahua
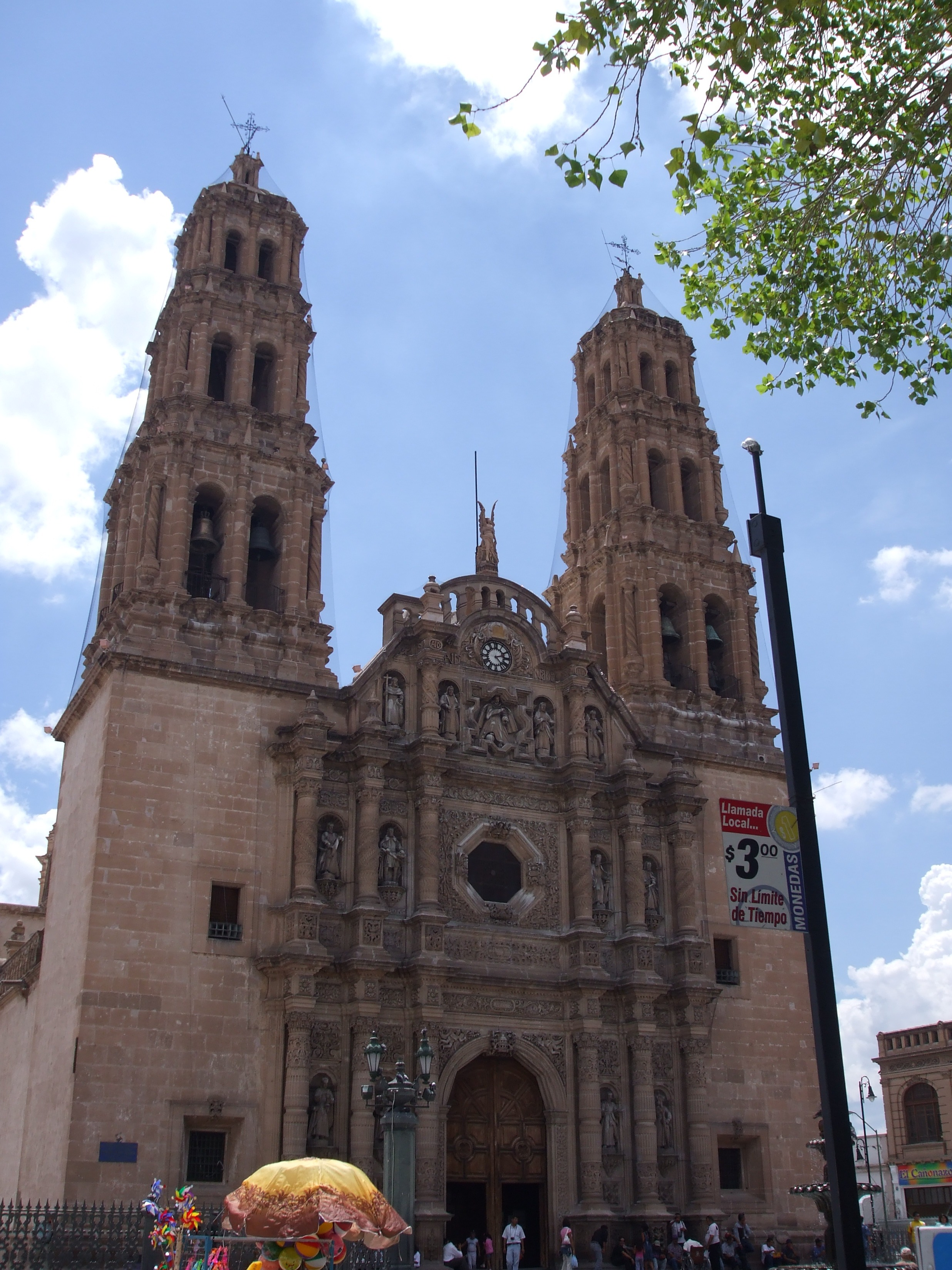
- Catedral Metropolitana

Location
- Country: Mexico
- Ecclesiastical province: Province of Chihuahua
- Metropolitan: Chihuahua, Chihuahua

Statistics
- Area: 28,565 sq mi (73,980 km^{2})
- Population: Total; Catholics: (as of 2006); 1,321,000; 1,176,000 (89%)
- Parishes: 59

Information
- Denomination: Catholic Church
- Rite: Roman Rite
- Established: 23 June 1891 (134 years ago)
- Cathedral: Metropolitan Cathedral of the Holy Cross, Our Lady of Regla and St. Francis of Assisi

Current leadership
- Pope: Leo XIV
- Archbishop: Constancio Miranda Weckmann

Map

The Archdiocese of Chihuahua (Latin: Archidioecesis Chihuahuensis) is a diocese of the Latin Church of the Catholic Church in Mexico.

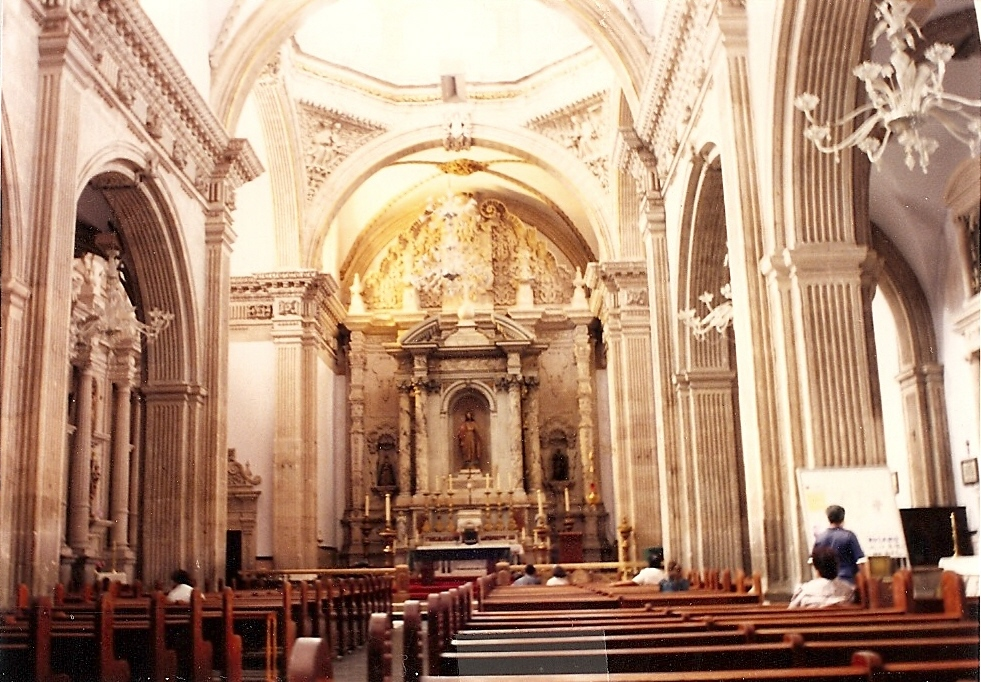
Metropolitan Cathedral of Chihuahua

== Early history ==
Erected in 1891 from the Diocese of Durango, the diocese consisted of the State of Chihuahua in its entirety. The Durango Diocese had been erected in 1620 as the diocese for the entire northern area of New Spain and is considered a mother diocese: Sonora, St Louis, New Mexico and Chihuahua were formed from Durango as population expanded in the 18th and 19th centuries.

== Anti-clericalism ==
The laws promulgated by the liberal government of President Benito Juárez, the Constitution of 1857 and the Mexican Revolution, together had the effect of disenfranchising the Catholic clergy and large swaths of Catholic laity. Thus studying for the priesthood became a difficult proposition for candidates in Chihuahua, and, indeed, in all of Mexico. Many of Chihuahua's priests were trained at the seminaries in El Paso, TX, Santa Fe, NM, and Phoenix, AZ. One of them, Fr. Pedro Maldonado, was ordained in the Cathedral of El Paso in 1918, martyred in 1937, and canonised by Pope John Paul II in 2000 .

In 2022 two Jesuit priests, Joaquin Mora and Javier Campos, were murdered by suspected members of a drug cartel after offering refuge to one Pedro Palma, who was fleeing the criminals and was also murdered.

== Demographics ==
The diocese was elevated to the level of Archdiocese on 22 November 1958 by Bl. Pope John XXIII, and now is the metropolitan of the following suffragan dioceses within the Ecclesiastical Province of Chihuahua: Ciudad Juárez, Cuauhtémoc-Madera, Nuevo Casas Grandes, Parral and Tarahumara. All of these suffragan dioceses were formed from Chihuahua, and are located within the physical boundaries of the State of Chihuahua.

The archdiocese encompasses 73,956 square kilometers in the center of the state, and as of 2006, contained 1,176,000 Catholics, 59 parishes, 131 priests and 10 permanent deacons. The archepiscopal see is the Metropolitan Cathedral of the Holy Cross, Our Lady of Regla, and St Francis of Assisi.

Constancio Miranda Weckmann was appointed by Pope Benedict XVI as archbishop and installed on 19 November 2009, succeeding José Fernández Arteaga , who had retired. Fernández had been appointed archbishop by Pope John Paul II in 1992; his predecessor, Adalberto Almeida y Merino, died on 21 June 2008, at the age of 92 at his home in Colonia Nombre de Dios, Chihuahua.

== Bishops ==
=== Ordinaries ===
- José de Jesús Ortiz y Rodríguez (10 Jun 1893 Appointed – 16 Sep 1901 Appointed, Archbishop of Guadalajara, Jalisco)†
- Nicolás Pérez Gavilán y Echeverría (20 Feb 1902 Appointed – 3 Dec 1919 Died)†
- Antonio Guízar y Valencia (20 Jul 1920 Appointed – 24 Aug 1969 Retired)† (Antonio Guízar was the younger brother of St Rafael Guízar Valencia .)
- Adalberto Almeida y Merino (24 Aug 1969 Appointed – 24 Jun 1991 Retired)†
- José Fernández Arteaga (24 Jun 1991 Succeeded – 28 September 2009 Retired)†
- Constancio Miranda Weckmann (28 September 2009 Appointed)

†-Deceased

=== Coadjutor bishops ===
- Luis Mena Arroyo (1964–1969); did not succeed to see; appointed Archbishop (Personal Title), Auxiliary of México, Federal District in 1979
- José Fernández Arteaga (1988–1991)

=== Auxiliary bishop ===
- Francisco Espino Porras (1943–1961)

=== Other priests of the diocese who became bishop ===
- Manuel Talamás Camandari, appointed Bishop of Ciudad Juárez, Chihuahua in 1957
- Luis Martín Barraza Beltrán, appointed Bishop of Torreón, Coahuila November 29 of 2017.
