= Cathedral of Chihuahua =

Cathedral in Chihuahua City, Mexico

Coordinates: 28.6358°N 106.0773°W

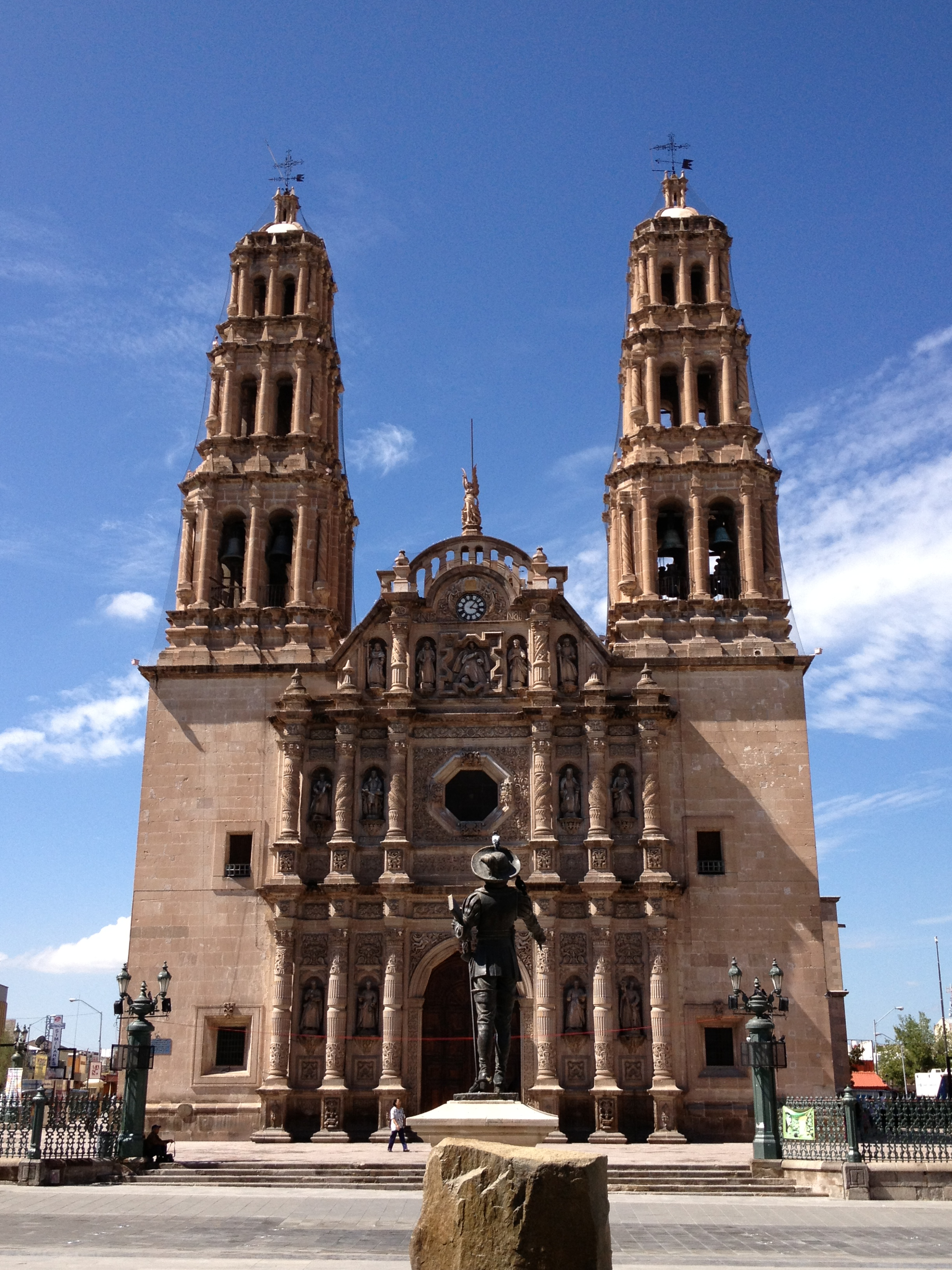
Façade of the cathedral

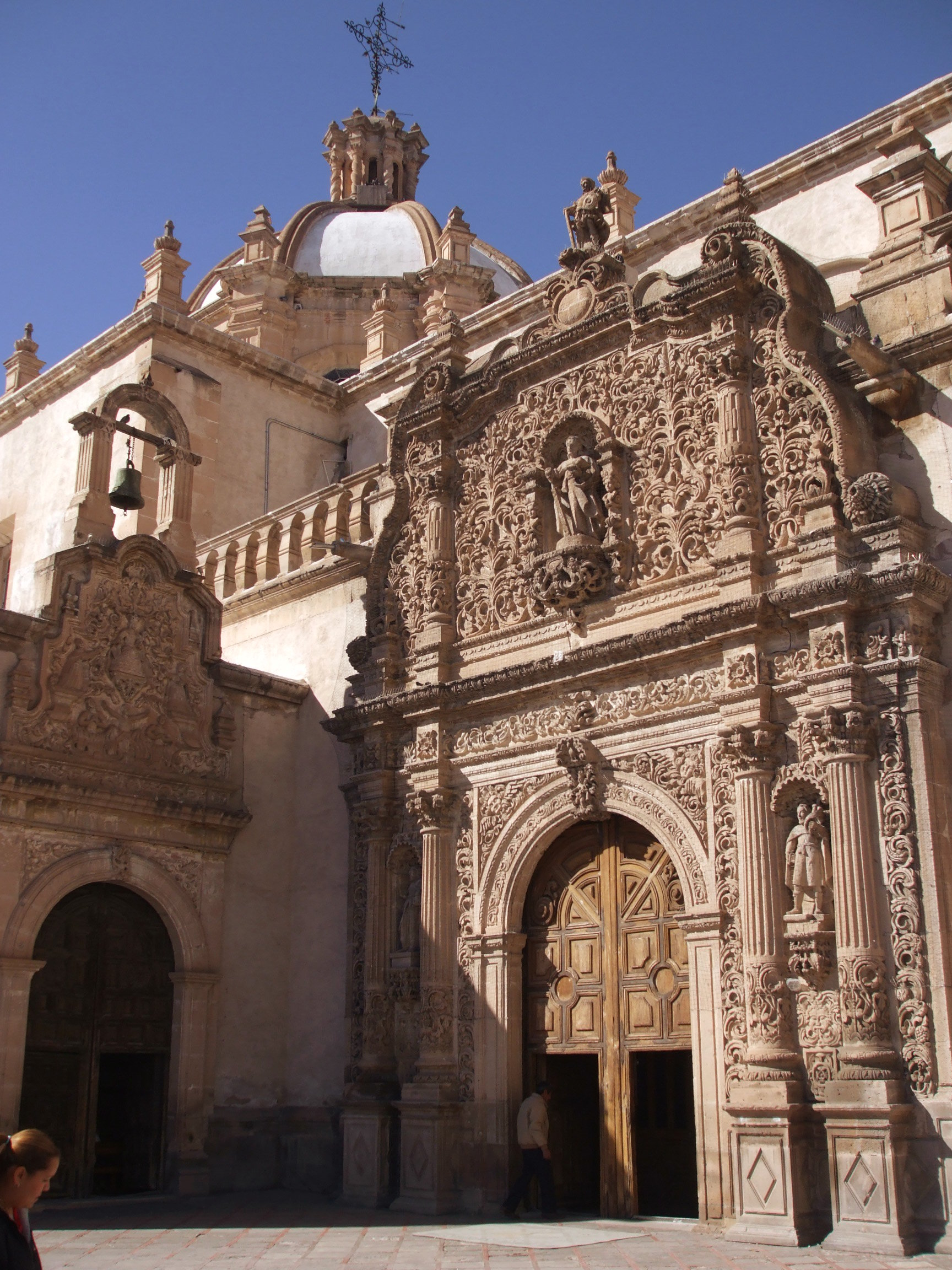
South Transept and Blessed Sacrament Chapel.

The Metropolitan Cathedral Church of the Holy Cross, Our Lady of Regla, and St Francis of Assisi is the main ecclesiastical building of the Catholic Church in Chihuahua City, Chihuahua, Mexico. It is considered perhaps the finest example of colonial architecture in northern Mexico and it was built between 1725 and 1792. The cathedral is also the seat of the Roman Catholic Archdiocese of Chihuahua. As of 2013 the archbishop was Constancio Miranda Weckmann.

== Style and architecture ==
The building is situated on the Plaza de Armas. It is designed in the Spanish Baroque style, and is in the form of a latin cross, with a dome above the crossing.

The façade is interesting in that it involves the use of solomonic columns which were not widely used in New Spain at the time. It has an octagonal window that was shipped from Germany and is considered a fine specimen of the glassmakers art. In addition, the front contains a collection of monuments celebrating the twelve apostles, with a clock above, crowned with the sculpture of an angel that was added in the 19th century. The royal Spanish coat of arms occupied the area below the angel, but was removed in 1874 by architect José Félix Maceira, and the clock, which was acquired in London, was added, giving the façade its present appearance.

The nave is divided from the ambulatories by arches which support the massive ceiling, and has a fine baptistry chapel on the right, or north side, just inside from the narthex. Directly opposite, on the south side, inside the Chapel of Christ of Mapimí, is the tomb of St Peter of Jesus Maldonado, a priest and martyr who was ordained in the Cathedral Parish of Saint Patrick in El Paso, Texas, and canonised by Pope John Paul II in 2000. The chapel is decorated with an 18th-century retablo, or reredos containing a venerated image of Christ, in which Primitive and Baroque elements are mingled. The chancel contains an unusual double altar, in which a smaller altar of Carrara marble was incorporated into the existing larger one of local quarry stone, after the church was built. The organ in the east gallery was built in 1885 by Hook and Hastings, Op. 1244 (2 manuals, 18 registers), and rebuilt and expanded by E F Walcker & Cie. in 1960. The Hook and Hastings instrument had, in turn, replaced a George Jardine organ that was built in 1837, and rebuilt by Jardine in 1869. Little remains of the Jardine or Hook and Hastings organs, the present facade was built locally in 1957 to duplicate the earlier facade which was destroyed by termites. The 1960 organ which was assembled by Alfredo Wolburg, the Mexico representative for E F Walcker, has as the upper manual enclosed division the pipes and mechanism from a three manual Robert Morton organ which was originally installed in a Mexico City movie theatre (the voicing of which suffered greatly during its installation in Chihuahua by Wolburg's lack of understanding of the orchestral style of organ building), the lower manual is on standard Walcker chests that appear to have been new in 1960, as was the console, with a mix of new and old pipework. The organ is still functional, however is in very fragile condition and about 20 years past when it probably should have been rebuilt.

The Blessed Sacrament Chapel, of baroque and rococo design, is reached by a door in the south side of the nave. The sculpture above the entrance depicts Our Lady of Regla and her supplicants, Ss Francis of Assisi and Rita of Cascia, the patrons of the city, above the Hebrews Shadrach, Meshach and Abednego in the fiery furnace (see illustration below). The Sacred Art Museum is located in the crypt, adjacent to the tombs of the past prelates of the archdiocese. It displays a collection of paintings by such known Colonial-era artists as Miguel Cabrera, José de Alcíbar, José de Páez and Antonio de Torres; portraits of Pope John Paul II and the prelates of Chihuahua are represented as well. The throne that the Pope used during his 1990 Mass in Chihuahua and the large and ornate former archbishops cathedra and canopy are on display, as are contemporary paintings of the cathedral and several life-sized statues of the saints, some of which are two centuries old.

== History ==
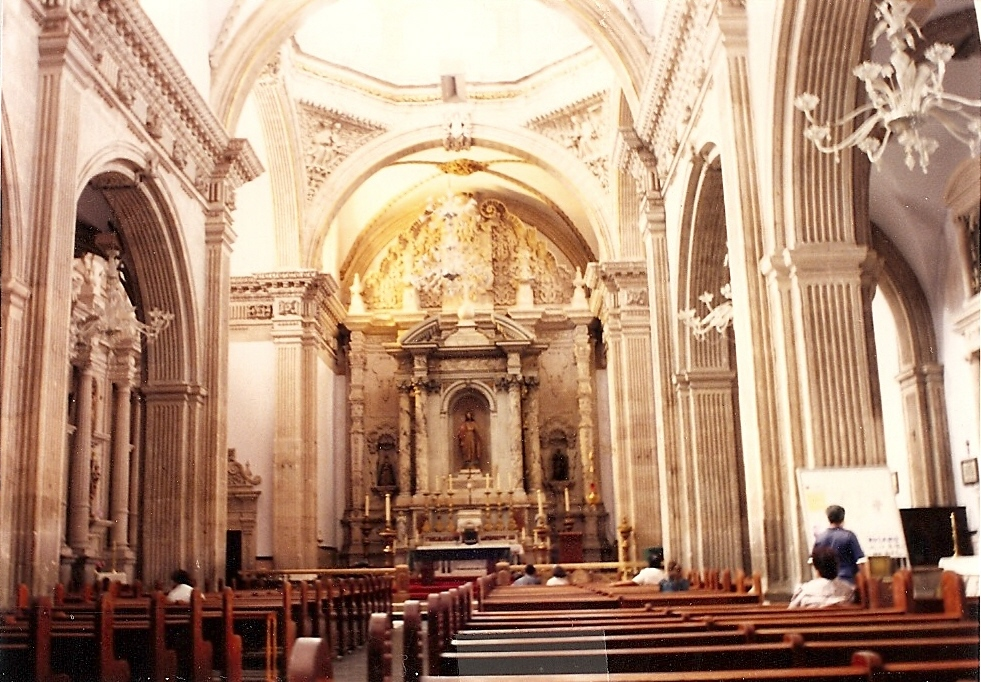
The nave and chancel of the Metropolitan Cathedral of Chihuahua

Originally, Sergeant-Major Don Juan Antonio Trasviña y Retes, one of the leading Spanish citizens of the village, donated the land for the first church in the villa, where the cathedral would later stand.

The first stone was placed on 21 June 1725 by the Bishop of Nueva Vizcaya in Durango, Don Benito Crespo y Monroy (in those times, Chihuahua depended religiously upon, and was a part of, the Diocese of Durango.) The church was paid for with local commercial donations and by mine owners in the city and in Santa Eulalia, a pueblo to the east, and also by a tax of one real on each mark of silver that was mined in the province.

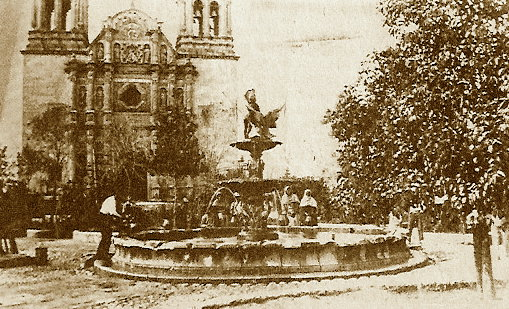
The Plaza de Armas and Cathedral, c.1874.

The first superintendent of construction was Pedro Coronado, followed by Miguel de la Sierra and then Master Architect José de la Cruz, who finalised the plans, and was buried in the church upon his death in 1734. Others followed until Architect Bernardo del Carpio began the construction of the towers in 1758. The bells had been cast in 1730, and were placed in the newly completed towers in 1780, directed by Superintendent Melchor Guaspe.

Construction of the church was completed in 1792. The building was slightly damaged during the French intervention in Mexico, repaired, and was designated a cathedral on 23 June 1891, with the erection of the Chihuahua diocese from the Diocese of Durango. At that time, the new diocese was responsible for the faithful throughout the entire state. Chihuahua was elevated to the status of an archdiocese on 22 November 1958 and now is the metropolitan archdiocese for five suffragan dioceses in the state of Chihuahua.

In 1910, with the commemoration of the century of the Independence of Mexico, the cathedral was decorated with lights. It was not until 2005 when the cathedral was illuminated again, this time permanently. In October 2008 celebrating the upcoming tricentenary of the city of Chihuahua, a lights display show took place at the cathedral.

== Other photographs ==
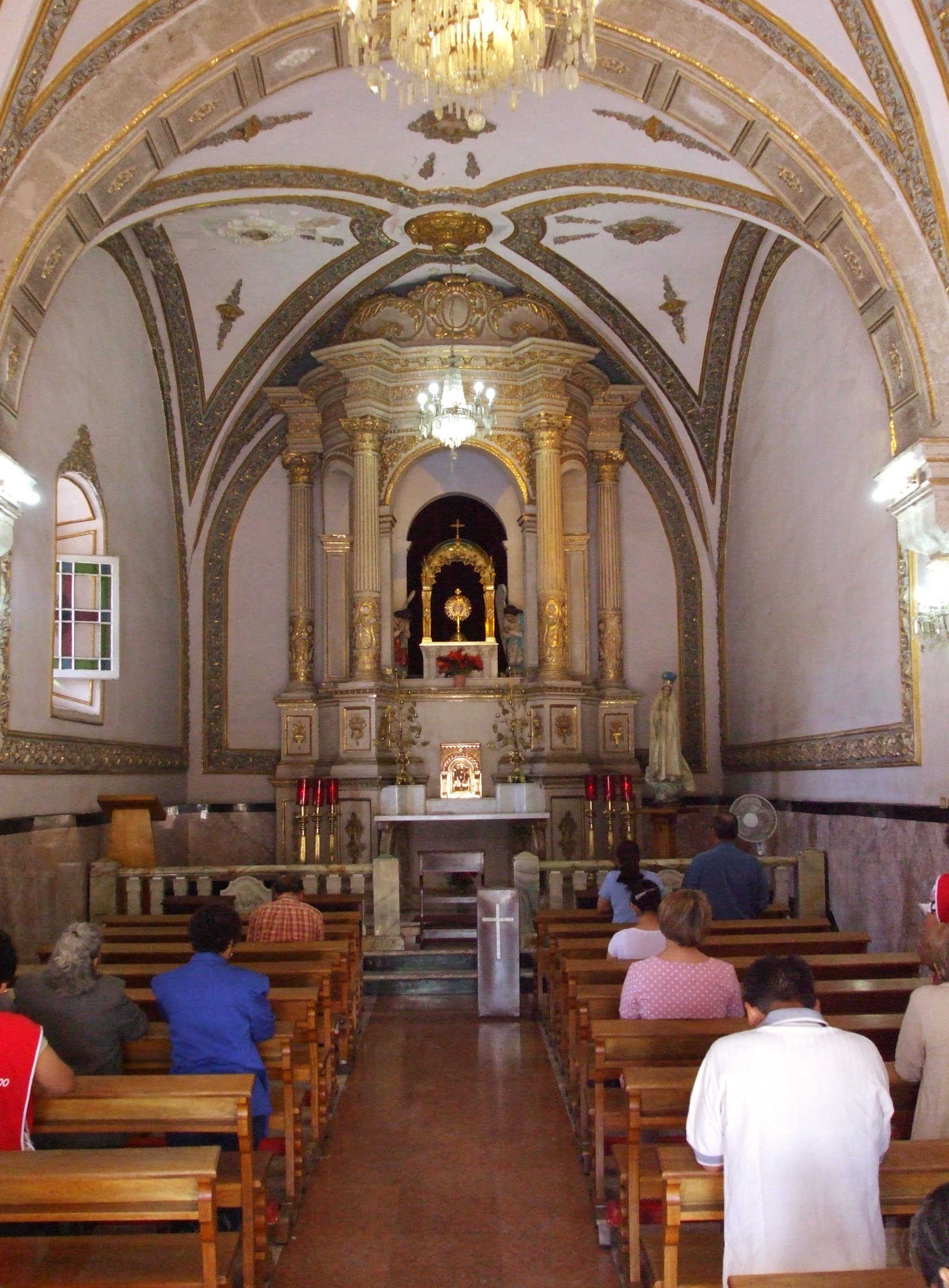
The Chapel of the Blessed Sacrament before restoration.

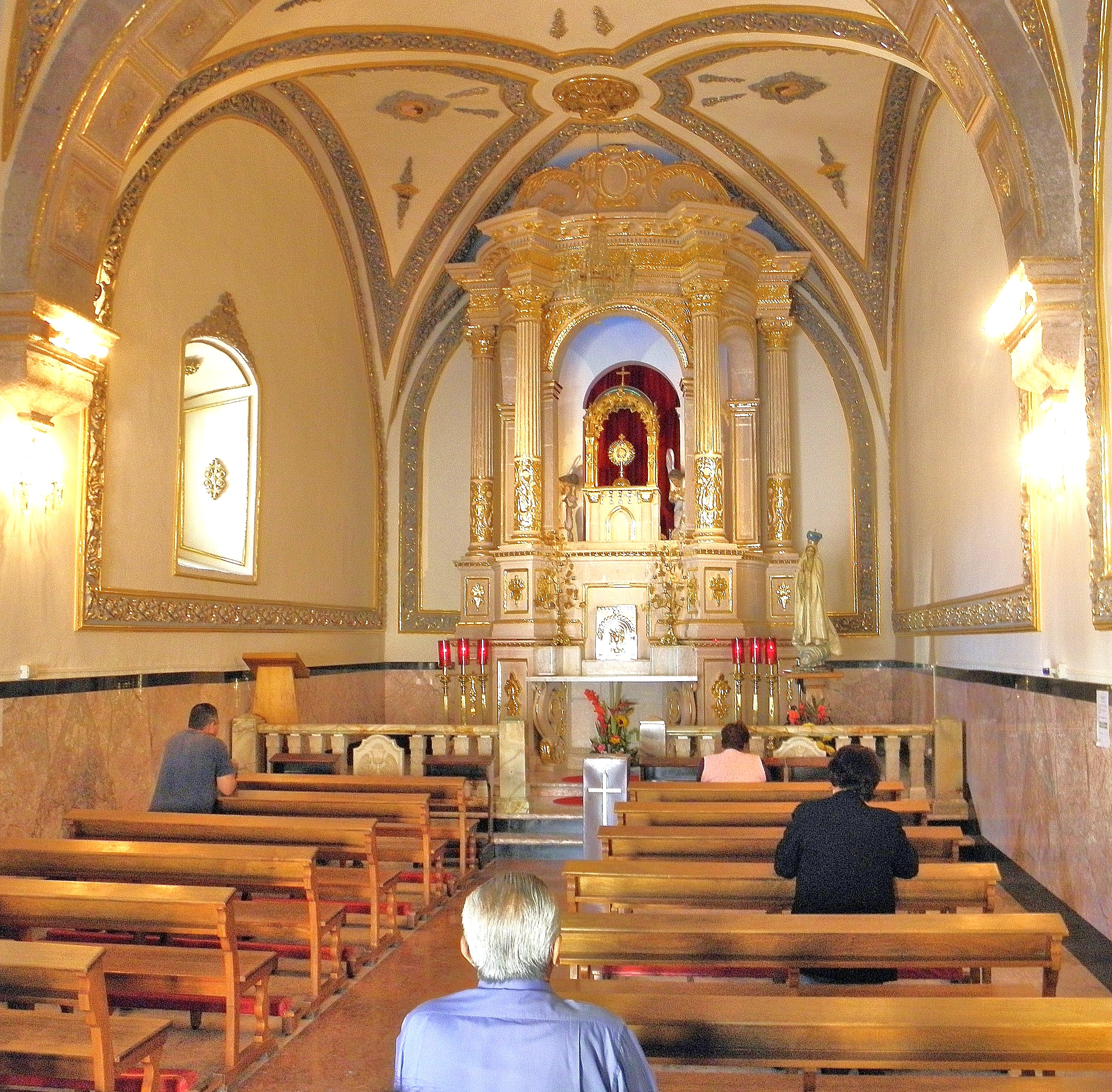
Chapel after two-year restoration finished in December 2010.

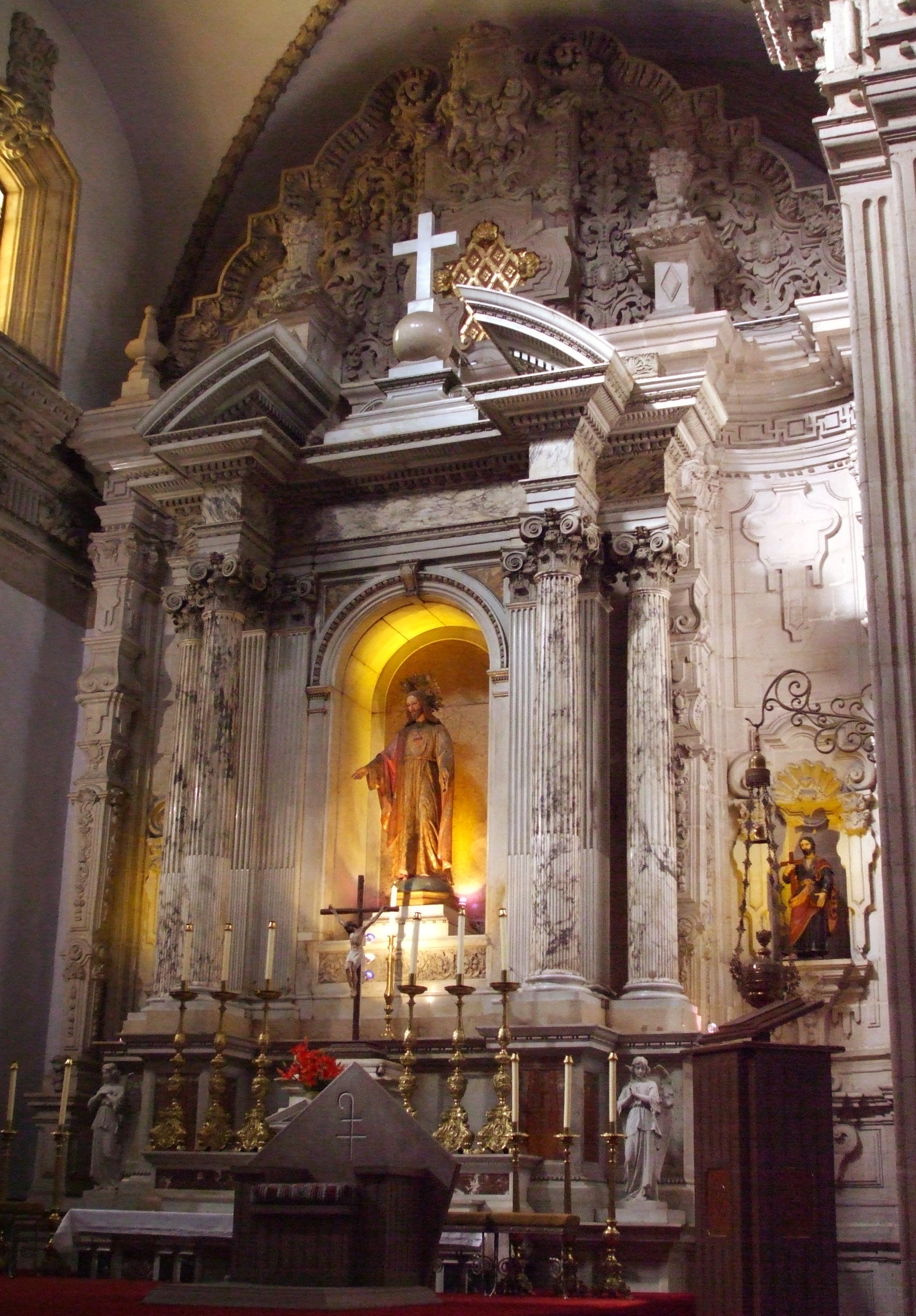
The unusual double High Altar.

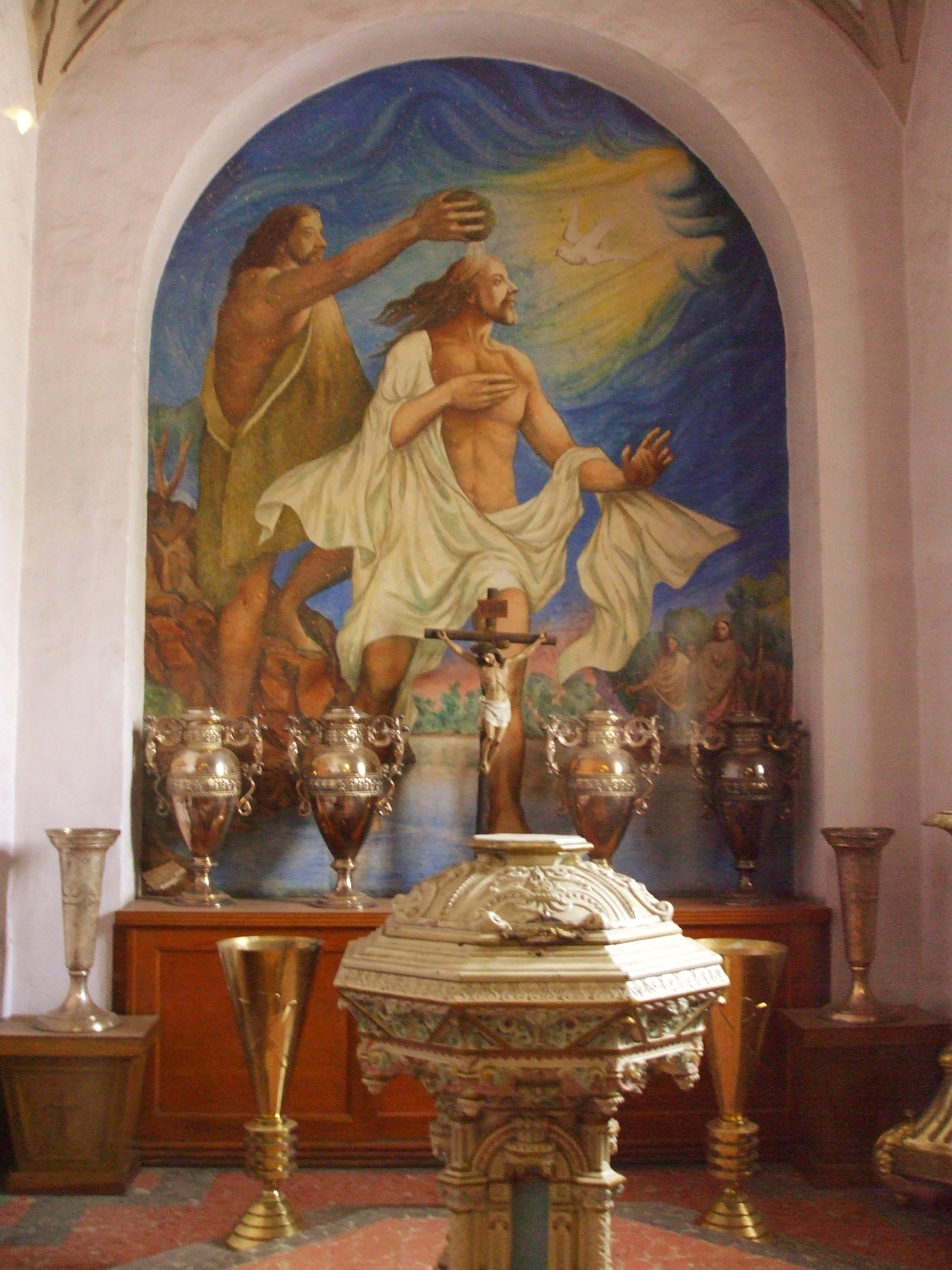
The Baptistry Chapel.

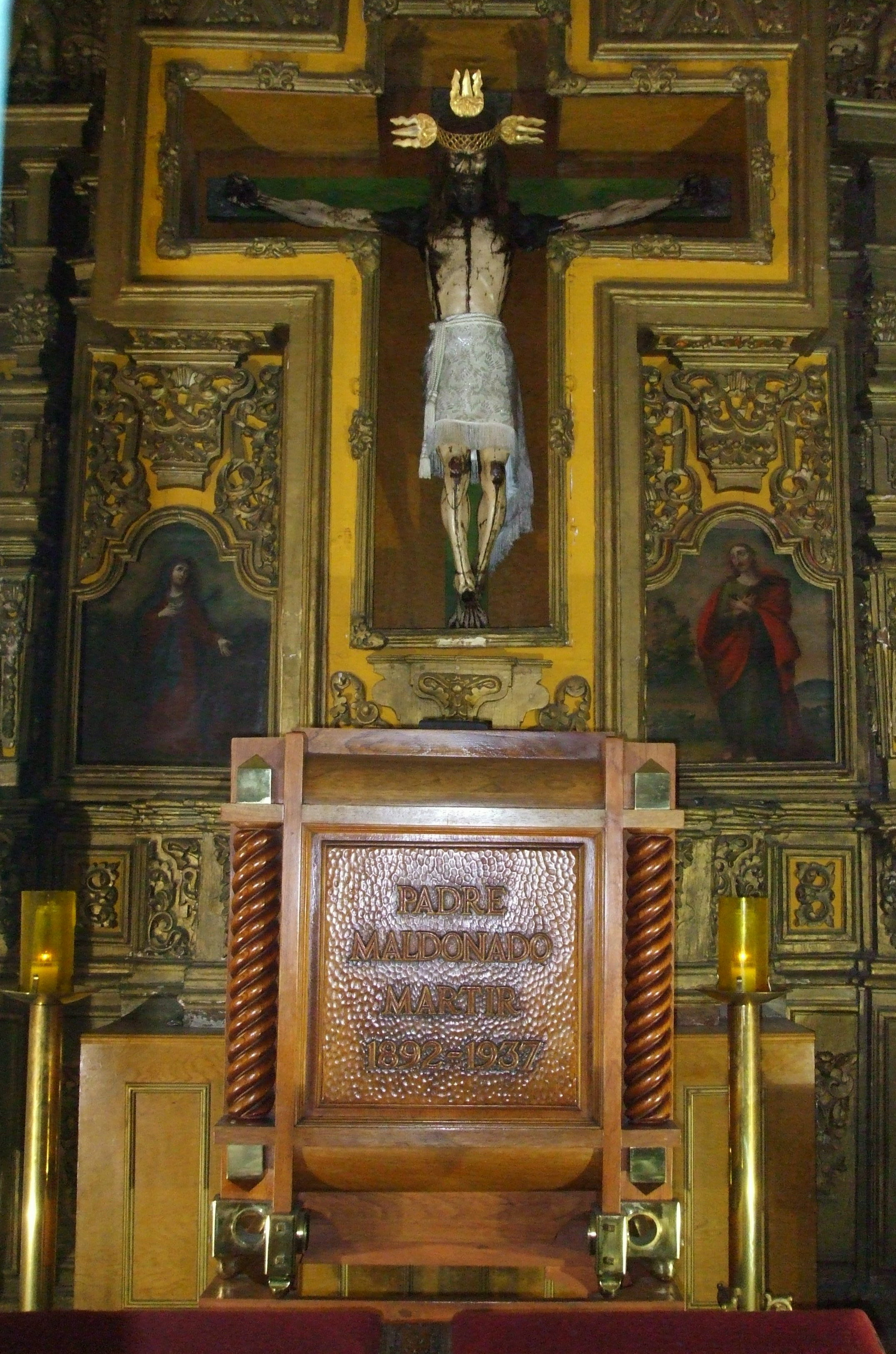
The Chapel of Christ of Mapimi and the Tomb of St Peter of Jesus.

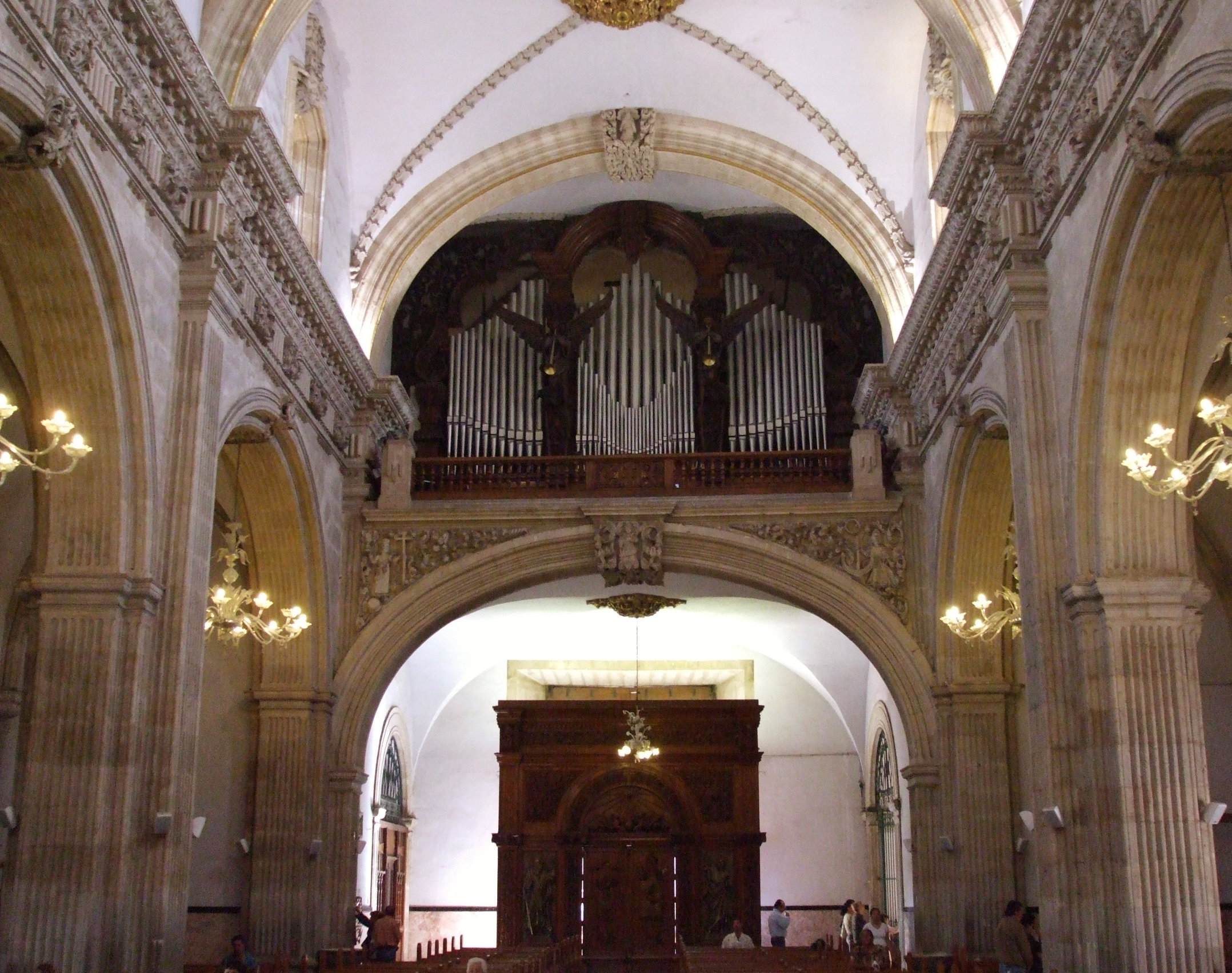
The Walcker organ in the east gallery.

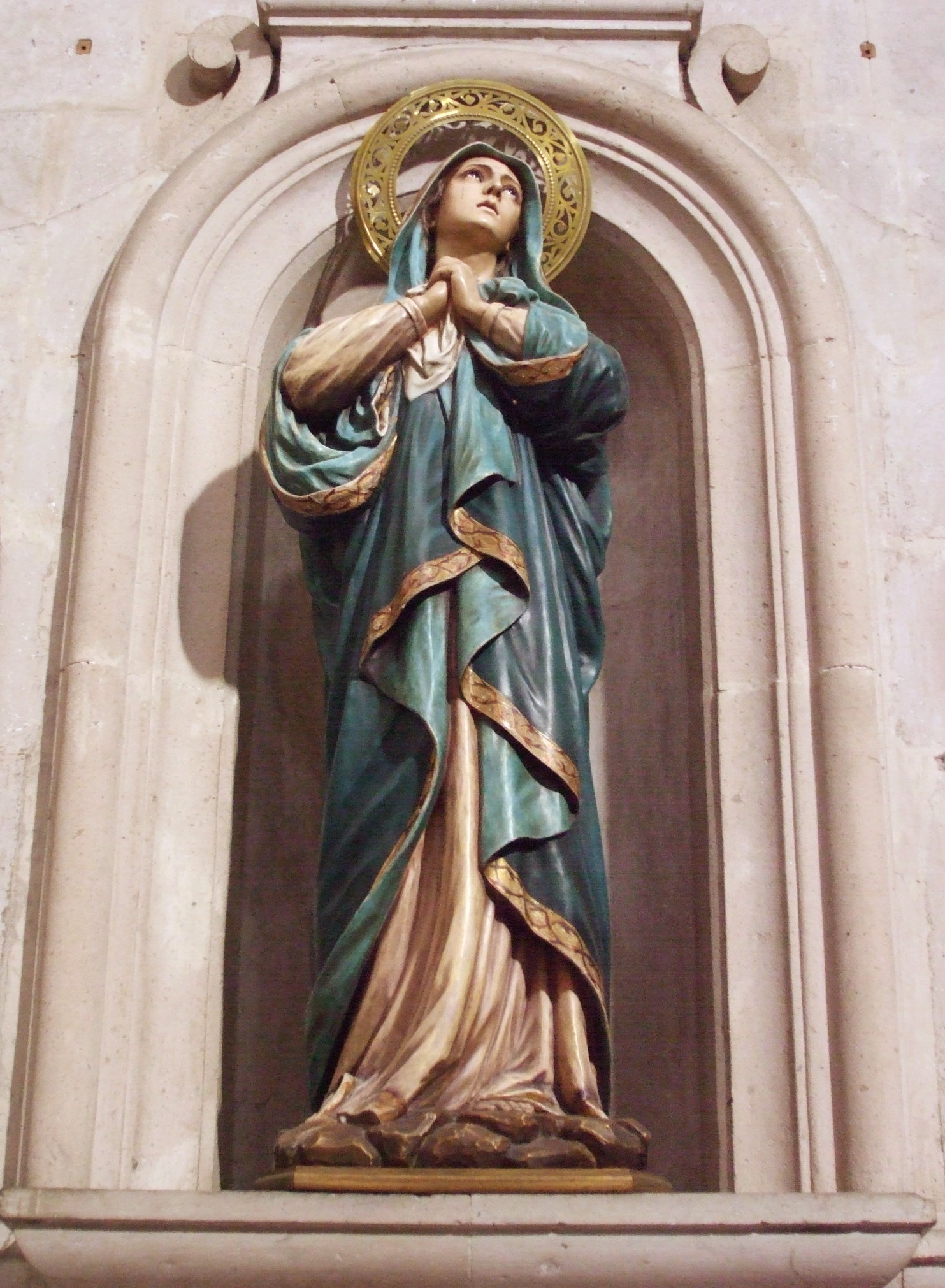
Statue of Our Lady of Sorrows.

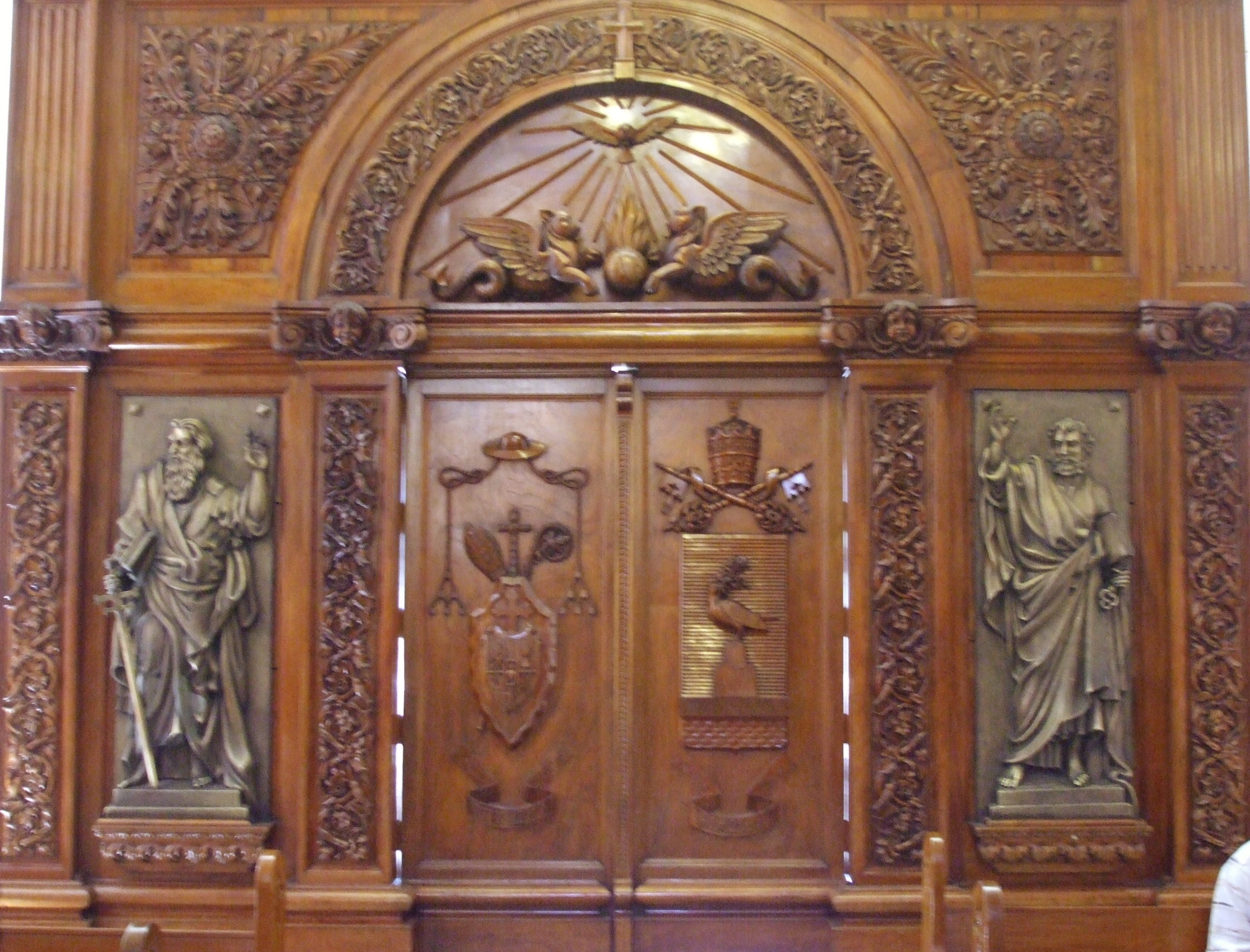
Nave screen at main doors.

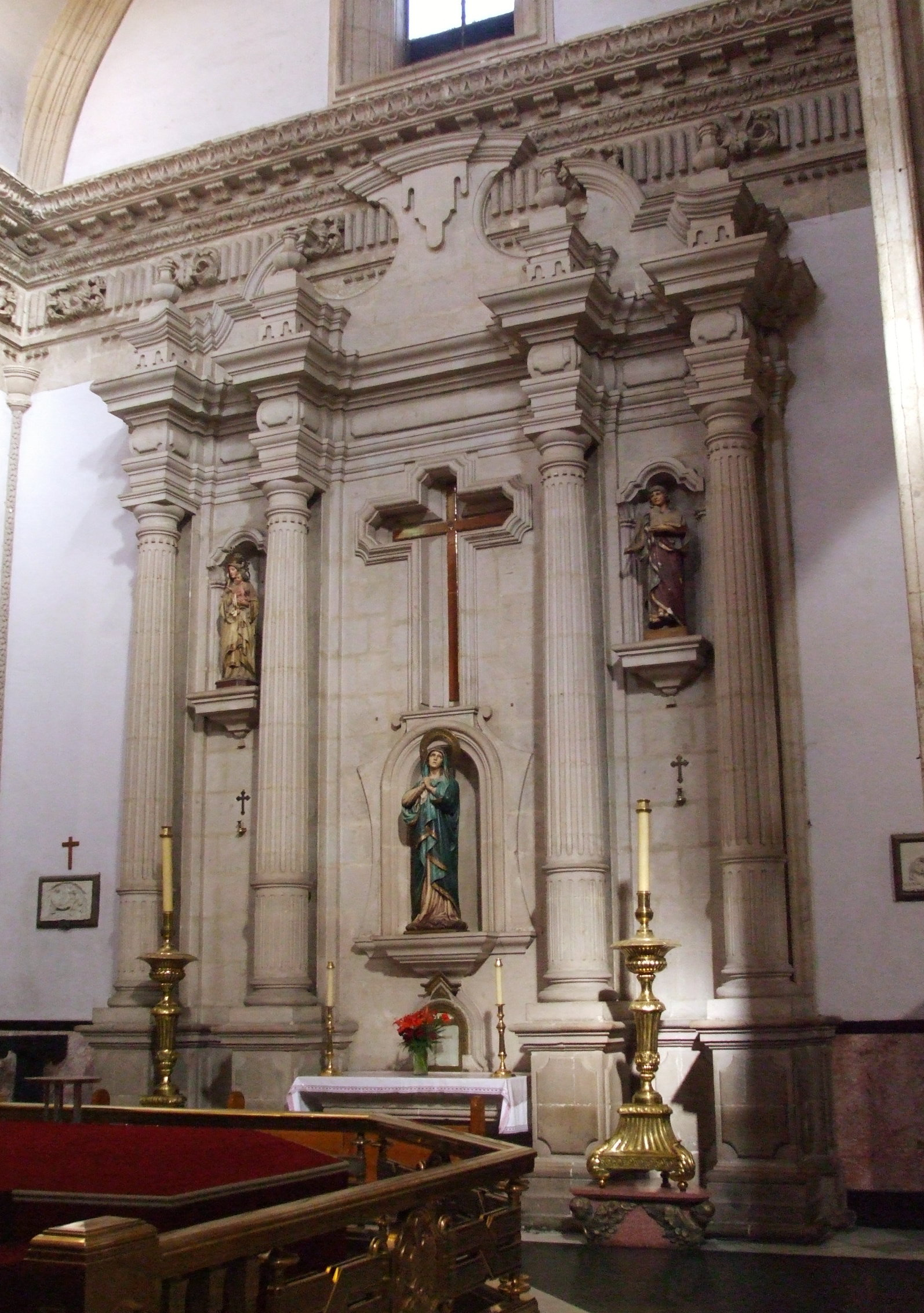
Side altar on northern side of chancel.

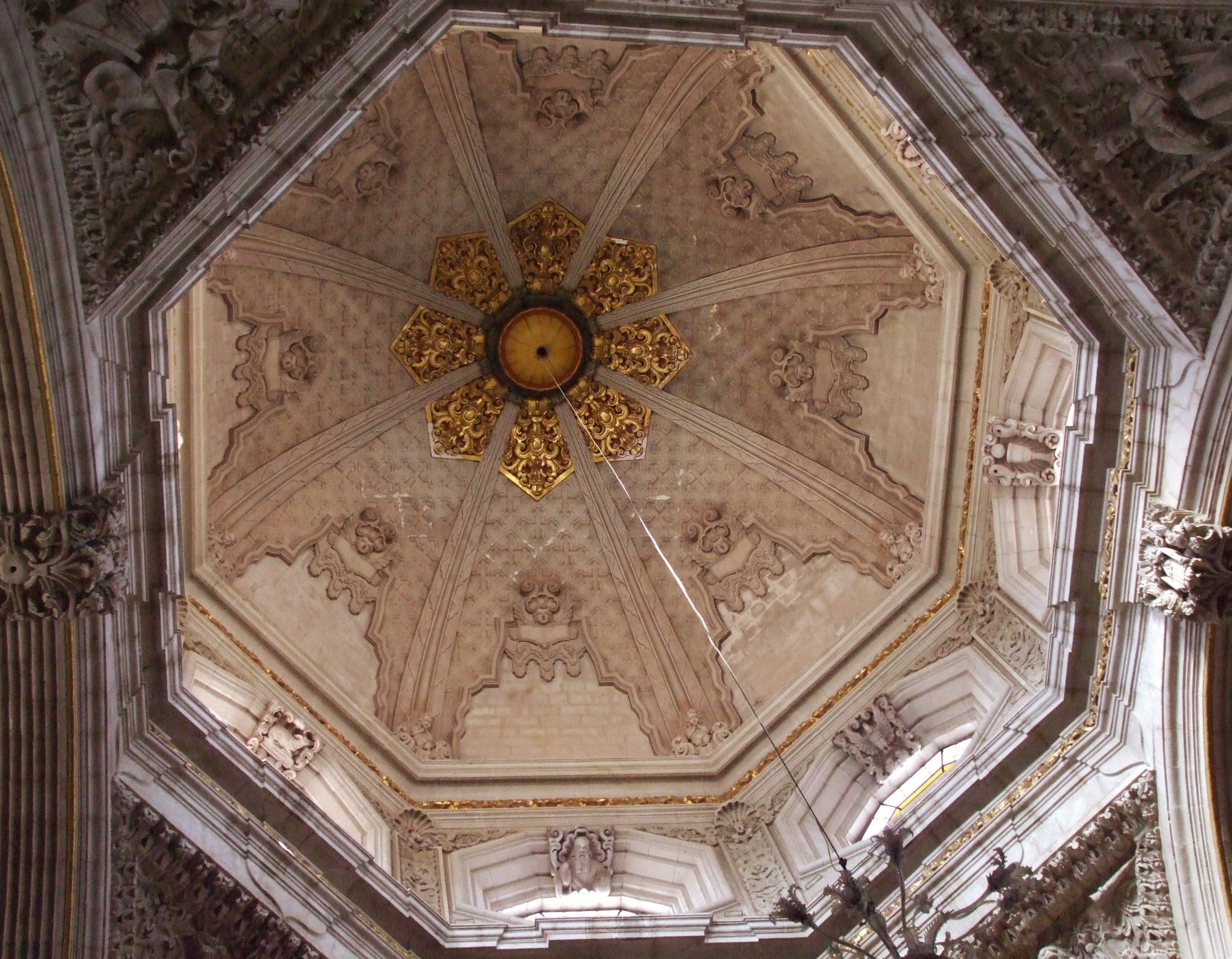
The dome over the crossing

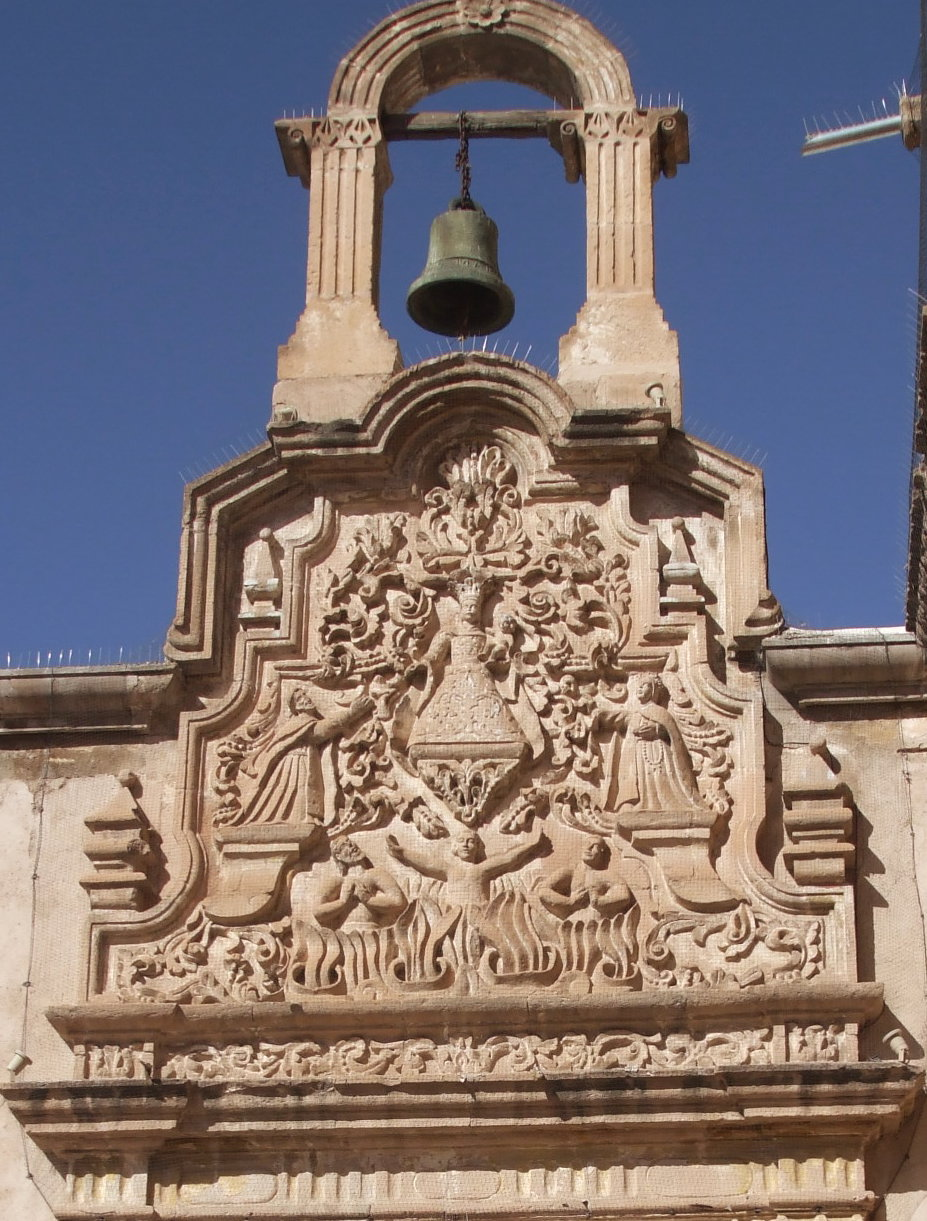
Detail of sculpture above entrance to Blessed Sacrament Chapel.

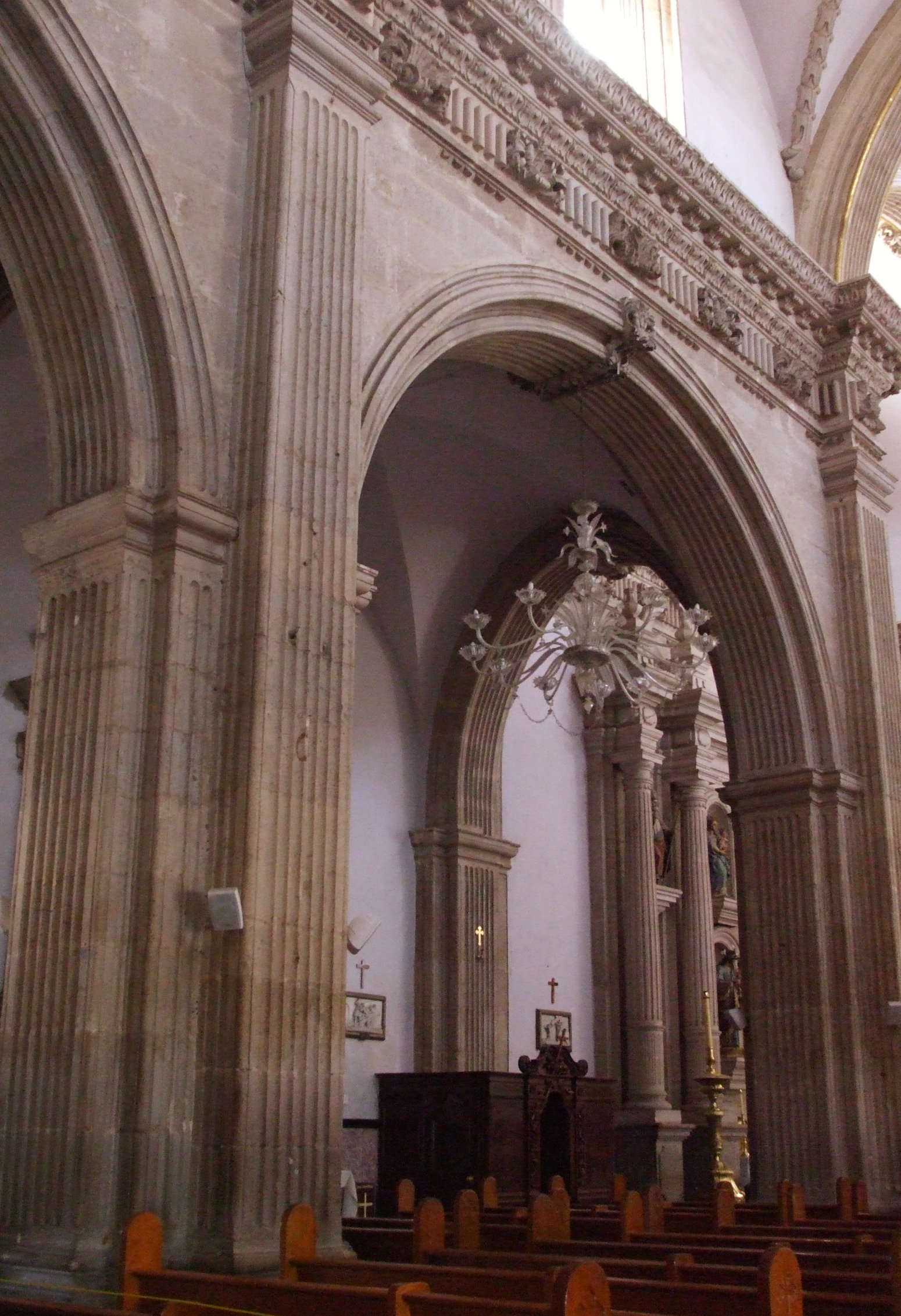
Detail of arch.

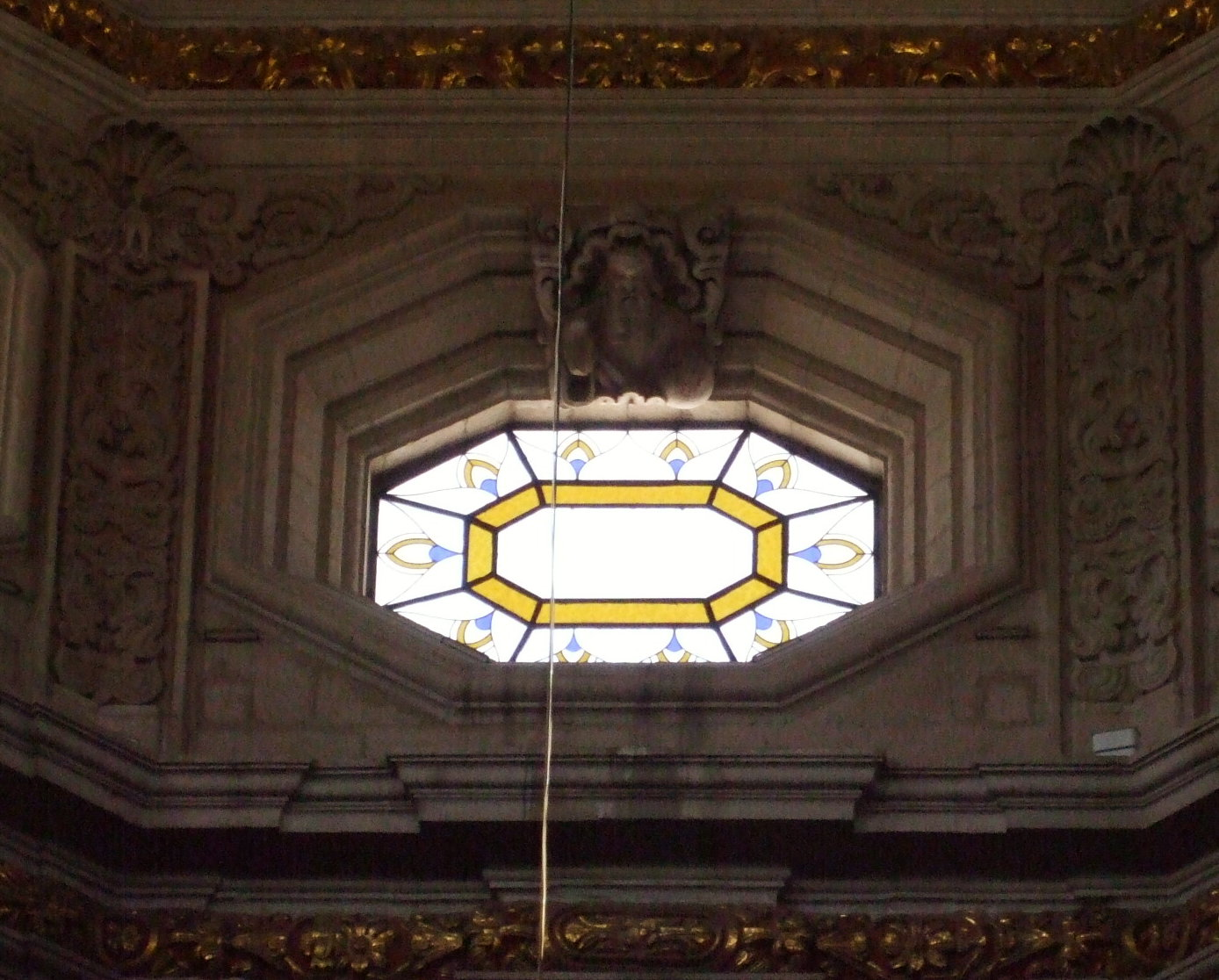
Detail of one of the windows in the dome.

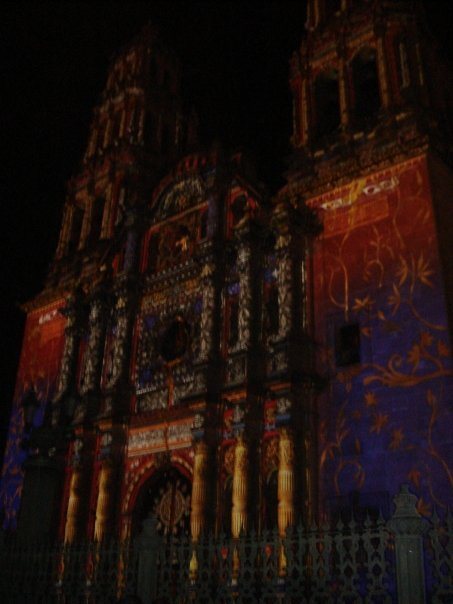
Display of lights at the Tricentenary celebrations
