= Constancio Miranda Weckmann =

Mexican Roman Catholic archbishop (born 1952)

- Archbishop of the Archdiocese of Chihuahua
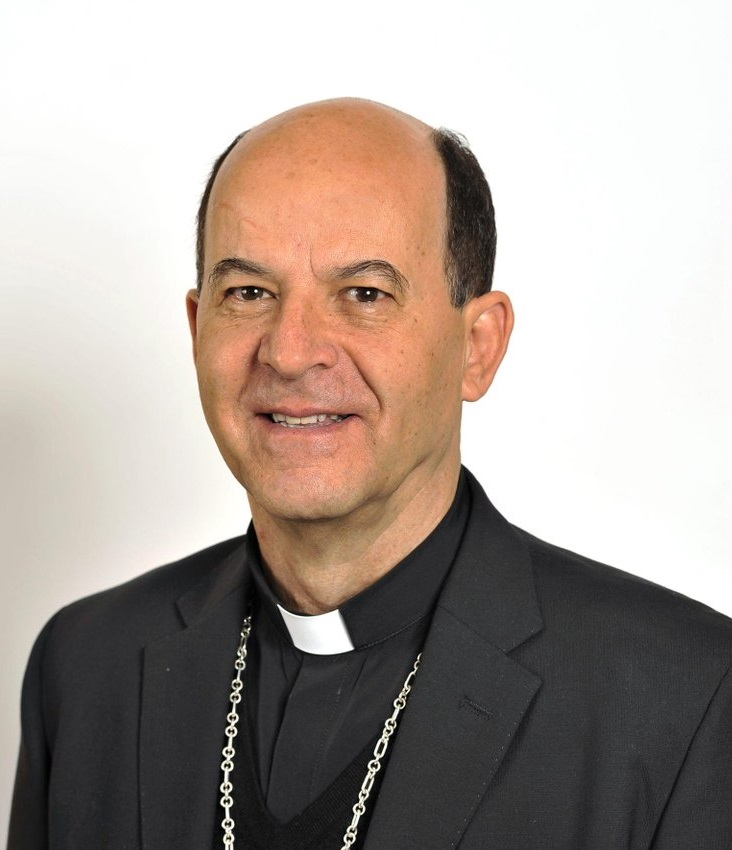
- Miranda Weckmann in March 2018
- Church: Roman Catholic Church
- Archdiocese: Archdiocese of Chihuahua
- In office: 2009–
- Predecessor: José Fernández Arteaga
- Previous posts: Bishop of Atlacomulco (1998–2009); Apostolic Administrator of Parral (June 2012)

Orders
- Ordination: 30 September 1977 by Justo Goizueta Gridilla O.A.R.
- Consecration: 4 August 1998 by Justo Mullor García
- Rank: Archbishop

Personal details
- Born: 15 September 1952 (age 73) Cruces, Chihuahua, Mexico
- Motto: Cristo vence (Christ comes)
- Coat of arms

Constancio Miranda Weckmann (born 15 September 1952) is a Mexican archbishop of the Roman Catholic church, currently serving as head of the archdiocese of Chihuahua. In the past he was also the bishop of Atlacomulco, as well as briefly serving as the apostolic administrator of the Diocese of Parral in June 2012.

== Personal life ==
Miranda Weckmann was born on 15 September 1952 in the small settlement of Cruces in the state of Chihuahua in Northern Mexico.

== Religious life ==
Miranda Weckmann carried out his priestly studies at the seminary of the Missionaries of the Nativity of Mary in León, Guanajuato, and later at the seminary of Ciudad Juárez the regional seminary of the north in Chihuahua. He was ordained a priest on 30 September 1977 by the then Bishop-prelate Justo Goizueta Gridilla O.A.R. as a secular priest for the Diocese of Cuauhtémoc-Madera. After his ordination he was sent to Rome where he was a student of the Pontifical Mexican College and graduated with a degree in Moral Theology at the Pontifical Alfonsina Academy.

=== As Bishop ===
On 27 June 1998 Miranda Weckmann was appointed to be bishop of the diocese of Atlacomulco. He was ordained a bishop on 4 August 1998, and consecrated by then-apostolic nuncio to Mexico Justo Mullor García. The co-consecrant were Ricardo Guízar Díaz, Archbishop of Tlalnepantla and Juan Guillermo López Soto, bishop of Miranda's home diocese of Cuauhtémoc-Madera.

=== As Archbishop ===
On 29 September 2009, it was announced that Miranda Weckmann was chosen by Pope Benedict XVI to be the next archbishop of Chihuahua to replace José Fernández Arteaga, who had reached the mandatory age of retirement of 75. Miranda Weckmann was installed as archbishop of Chihuahua on 19 November 2009.
