= Thomas M. Fullerton =

Thomas M. Fullerton Jr. is an American economist and academic who currently serves as a professor of economics at the University of Texas at El Paso (UTEP). He holds the Endowed Chair for the Study of Trade in the Americas and directs the Border Region Modeling Project. Fullerton's research interests lie in the field of Applied Economics, with a focus on Border Economics, Urban Economics, Regional Forecasting, Resource Economics, and International Economics.

== Education ==
Fullerton holds a BBA in Economics from UTEP, an MS in economics from Iowa State, an MA in Business Economics from the Wharton School at the University of Pennsylvania, and a Ph.D. in economics from the University of Florida.

== Books ==
- T. M. Fullerton Jr. and Adam G. Walke, 2017, Improving the Accuracy of Short-Term Water Demand Forecasts, Denver, CO: Water Research Foundation, ISBN 978-1-60573-298-5.
- T. M. Fullerton Jr. and Adam G. Walke, 2017, Short-Term Water Demand Forecasting Manual, Denver, CO: Water Research Foundation, ISBN 978-1-60573-299-2.
- T. M. Fullerton Jr. and M. P. Barraza de Anda, 2006, Basic Border Econometrics, Ciudad Juárez, MX: UACJ Press, ISBN 968-7845-85-6.
- C. Calderón Villarreal and T. M. Fullerton Jr., 2000, Inflationary Studies for Latin America, El Paso, TX: Texas Western Press, www.utep.edu/twp/inflation.htm, ISBN 968-7845-20-1.

== Selected journal articles ==
- T. M. Fullerton Jr. and O. Solis, 2020, “Borderplex Bridge Wait Time Headache Reactions,” Journal of Transport Economics & Policy 54 (1), 58–78.
- T. M. Fullerton Jr., A. Jiménez, and A.G. Walke, 2015, “An Econometric Analysis of Retail Gasoline Prices in a Border Metropolitan Economy,” North American Journal of Economics & Finance 34, 450–461, doi: 10.1016/j.najef.2015.09.005.
- T. M. Fullerton Jr. and A. L. Molina Jr., 2010, “Municipal Water Consumption Forecast Accuracy,” Water Resources Research 46 (June), Article W06515, doi:10.1029/2009WR008450.
- L. Blanco-González and T. M. Fullerton Jr., 2006, “Borderplex Menu Evidence for the Law of One Price,” Economics Letters 90 (1), 28–33, doi: 10.1016/j.econlet.2005.04.005. =
- T. M. Fullerton Jr., 2001, “Specification of a Borderplex Econometric Forecasting Model,” International Regional Science Review 24 (2), 245–260, doi: 10.1177/016001701761013141.
- C. T. West and T. M. Fullerton Jr., 1996, “Assessing the Historical Accuracy of Regional Economic Forecasts,” Journal of Forecasting 15 (1), 19–36, doi: 10.1002/(SICI)1099-131X(199601)15:1<19::AID-FOR602>3.0.CO;2-B.
- T. M. Fullerton Jr., 1989, “A Composite Approach to Forecasting State Government Revenues,” International Journal of Forecasting 5 (3), 373–380, doi: 10.1016/0169-2070(89)90040-X.
