= List of museums in Chihuahua =

The Mexican city of Chihuahua was founded in 1709 and has a rich history that is reflected in the museums found there, which range in subject matter from prehistoric times to the modern day.

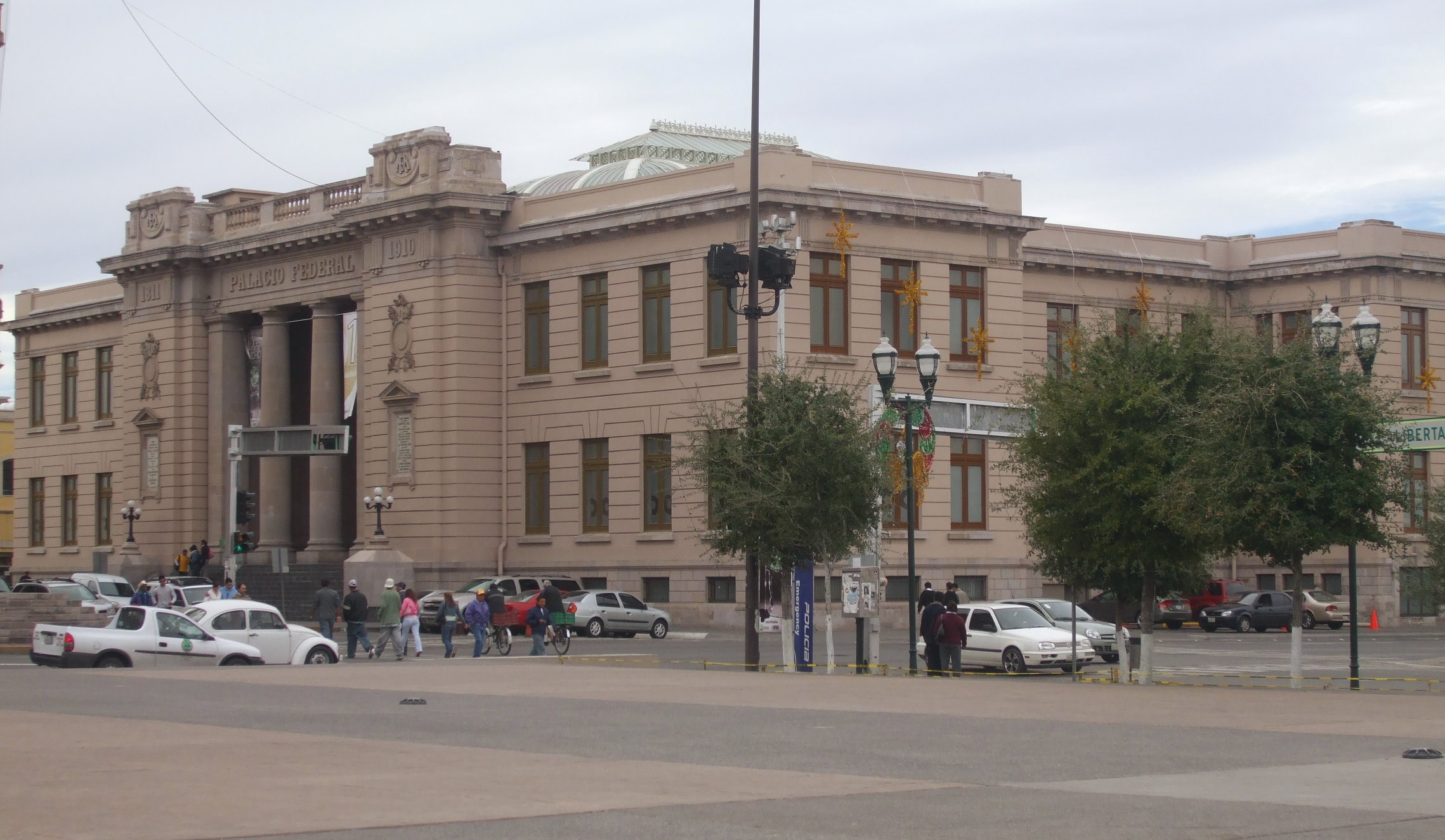
Museo Casa Chihuahua.

- Museo Casa Chihuahua is an early 20th-century building in Chihuahua city centre. It served as the federal building for the city until 2004, when it was renovated as a city museum, specialising in traveling exhibits, with everything from the fine arts to the decorative arts, to exhibits such as a numismatic history of the Republic. It also houses, in the basement, the jail cell of Fr Miguel Hidalgo y Costilla, widely considered the 'Father of the Country'. Fr Hidalgo was the first leader of the insurgency for independence from Spain. He was captured by the Spaniards early in 1811, tried and executed on 30 July 1811 at the neighbouring Government Palace. It is on the Avenida Venustiano Carranza and Calle Libertad.
- Government Palace of Chihuahua. Though not technically a museum, the Government Palace or State House of Chihuahua contains some of the finest murals in the Republic. The entire first floor and much of the second floor are covered in murals commemorating the history of the state, painted by one of Mexico's renowned muralists, Aarón Piña Mora. The stained-glass windows in the main staircase and on the second and third floors, as well as the sculpture in the courtyard, are interesting examples of these art forms.

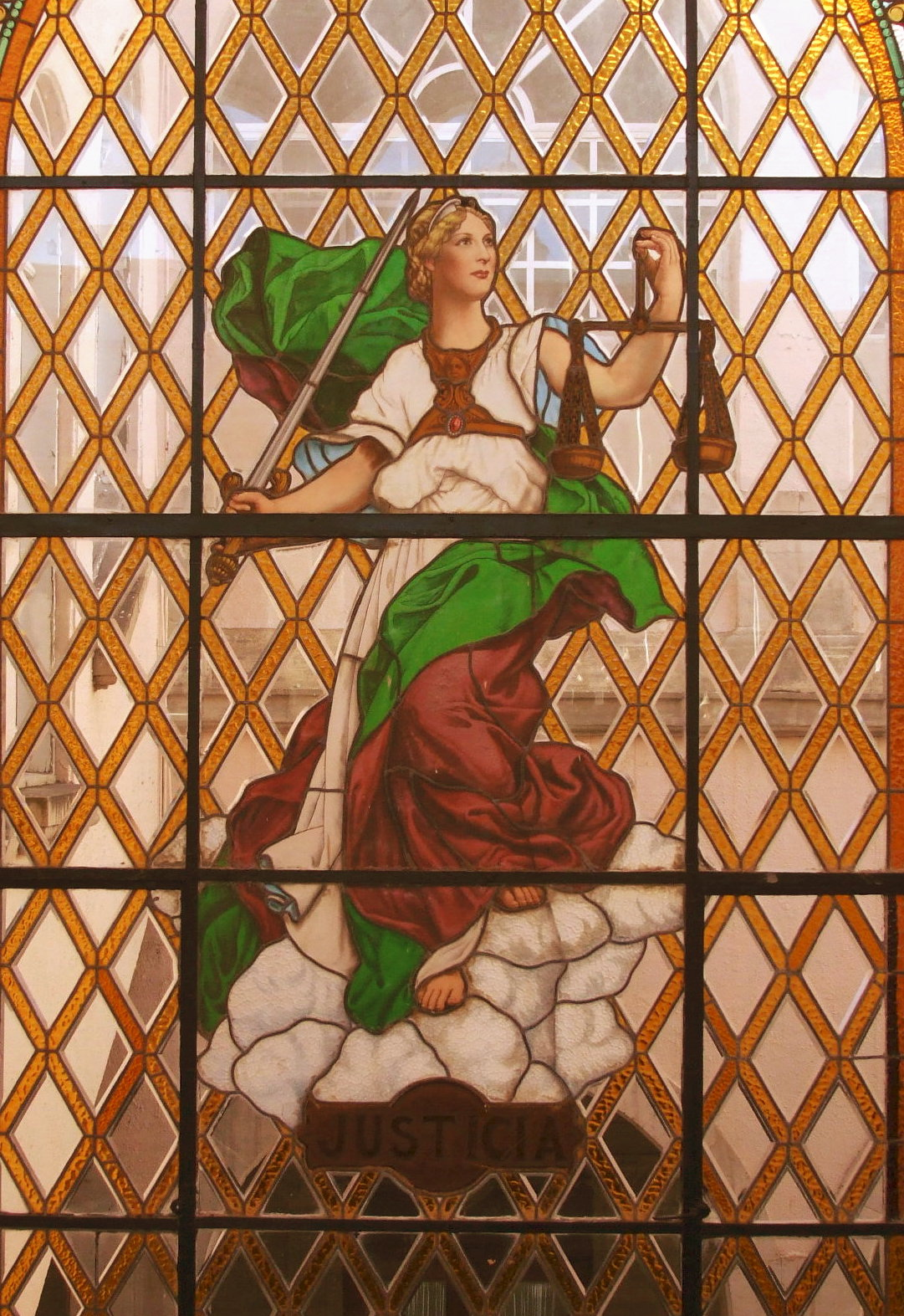
Above and below: The Government Palace.

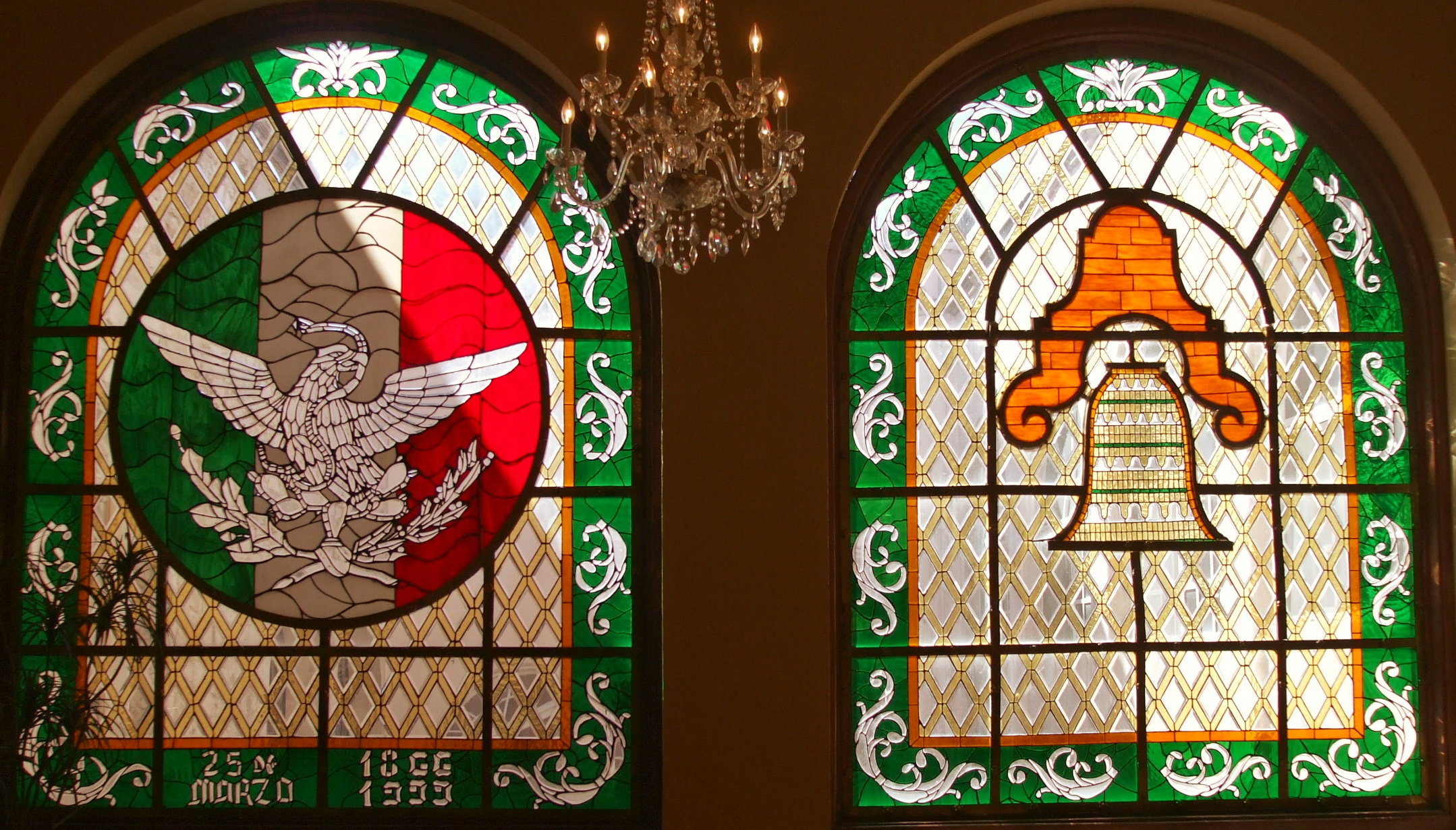

- During the French invasion and the Second Empire, which ended with the execution of the Habsburg Emperor Maximilian in 1867, the constitutional president, Benito Juárez García traveled the country, searching for support wherever he could. He found it in 1864 when he settled his cabinet and government-in-exile here in the city at the address now known as Ave. Juárez 321. The Museo Casa Juárez, now known as the Museum of Republican Loyalty, has been faithfully restored to the appearance it had when President Juárez lived here from 1864 through 1866.
- The Quinta Gameros, one of the largest and most impressive estate houses in pre-revolutionary Chihuahua City, is now the state museum for the decorative arts, featuring glassware, furniture, and a special exhibit on the architecture of Casas Grandes, the site of extensive Paquimé indigenous ruins northwest of Chihuahua City. It is on the Avenida Bolívar.
- The Mammoth Museum, at Gomez Morin (also Calle 27a) and Ave. Juárez, is the city natural history museum and contains 13 halls detailing prehistoric life from the dinosaurs through the reign of the mammals (the Cenozoic Era). It also has exhibits of prehistoric art.
- The Semilla Museo Centro de Ciencia y Tecnología, or Seed Centre Museum of Science and Technology, on Teofilo Borunda and Lisboa in the City Centre, is a creative learning centre and interactive science museum for children.
- La Casa Redonda is the old roundhouse and back shop for the Chihuahua-Pacific and Mexican National Railroads, It dates from the late 19th century, built during the golden age of steam. It has been completely redone as an art museum and features paintings by Mexican artists as Diego Rivera, José Clemente Orozco and Frida Kahlo as well as artifacts relating to its railroad days. It is on the Avenida Tecnológico adjacent to the Convention Center.

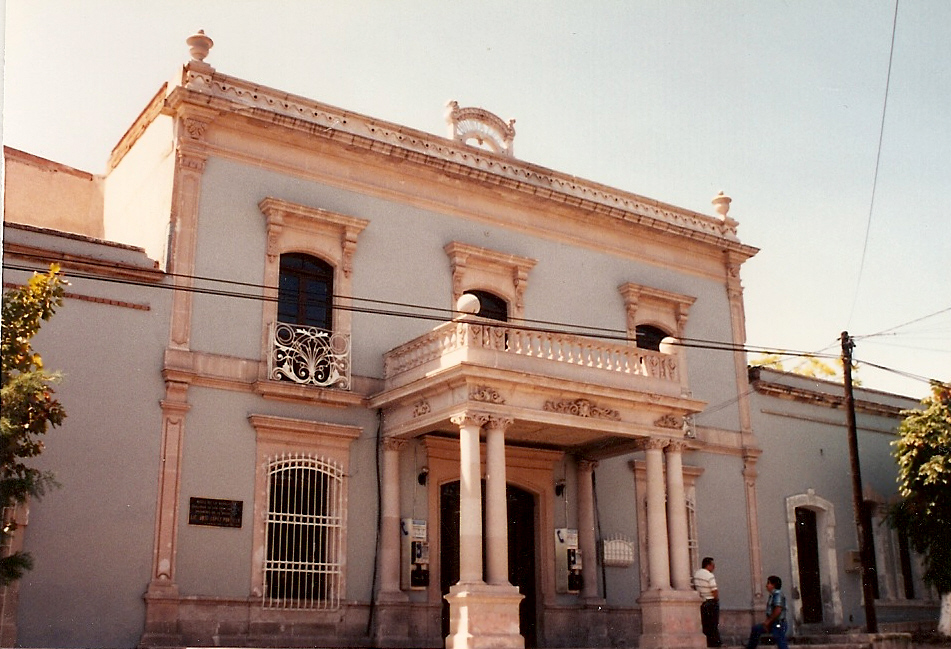
The Quinta Luz.

- The Sacred Art Museum of the Metropolitan Cathedral is in the crypt, adjacent to the tombs of the past prelates of the archdiocese. It displays a collection of paintings by such artists as Miguel Cabrera, José de Alcíbar, José de Páez and Antonio de Torres, all of whom are from the Colonial era. Portraits of the bishops and archbishops of Chihuahua and Pope John Paul II are also represented in the collection. The throne that the pope used during his 1990 mass in Chihuahua and the former archbishops seat of the church are on display. It is on the Plaza de Armas.
- The Historical Museum of the Mexican Revolution is housed in the former estate of General Francisco Villa and his widow, Sra María Luz Corral de Villa, the 'Quinta Luz'. The house and its extensive collection of villa memorabilia, as well as souvenirs and documents relating to other revolutionary leaders, was turned over to the Mexican government in 1981 upon the death of Mrs Villa. It is on the corner of Calle 5a and Nicolás Bravo.

Of interest is the City Hall, which faces the Cathedral on the Plaza de Armas, especially the Council Chamber on the second floor off the main staircase. It is on the Avenida Independéncia.
