= List of tallest buildings in Chihuahua City =

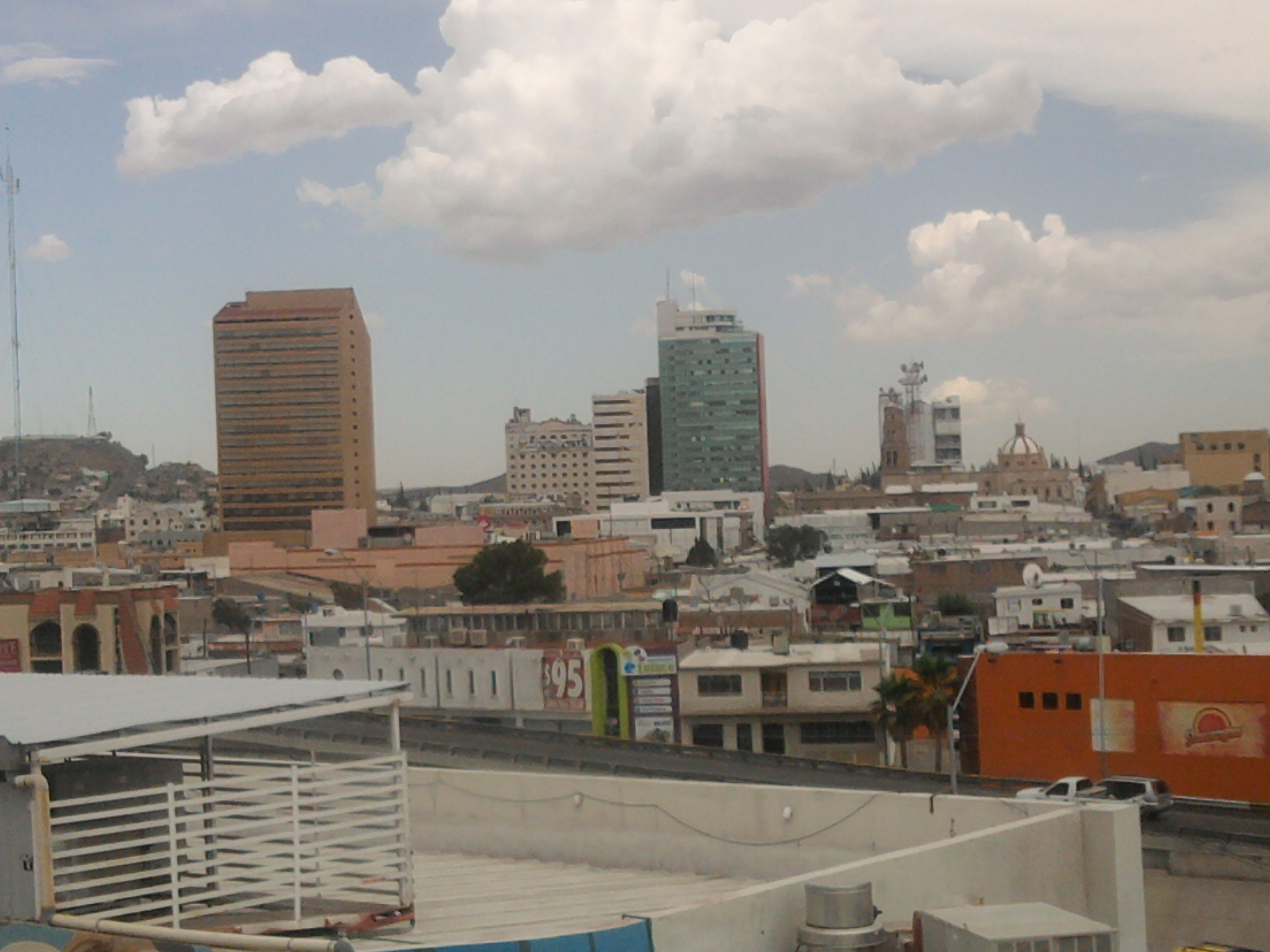
The Chihuahua skyline

This list of tallest buildings in Chihuahua ranks skyscrapers in Chihuahua City, Chihuahua, Mexico, by height. The tallest structure in Chihuahua City is the tronera avalos which rises 430 feet (130 m) in avalos district. The tallest building in Chihuahua City is the cenit tower which rises 291 feet (89 m) in Chihuahua juventud and was completed in 2012. In Downtown Chihuahua is the second-tallest building, the legislature building, which rises 288 feet (88 m) and was completed in 1973, and was, at the time, one of the tallest buildings in Mexico.

== Tallest buildings ==
This list ranks Chihuahua skyscrapers that stand at least 65 feet (20 m) tall. An equal sign (=) following a rank indicates the same height between two or more buildings. Freestanding observation and telecommunication towers, while not habitable buildings, are included for comparison purposes; they are, however, not ranked.

Rank	Name	Image	Height ft (m)	Floors	Year
N/A	Tronera avalos	Tronera Avalos in the Foundry of Avalos	430 (131)	0	1906
1	Lumina Tower		427 (130)	34	2016
2	Sphera Tower		347 (106)	28	2015
N/A	Asta bandera el palomar		328 (100)	0	-
3	Cenit Tower		291 (89)	21	2012
4	Legislature Building		288 (88)	18	1975
5	Palacio del Sol hotel		281 (85.82)	19	1980
6	Justice center		(72)	10	2015
7	telmex tower		203 (62)	14	1981
8	Hospital Star Medica Chihuahua		164 (50)	13	2015
N/A	The Gate to Chihuahua	Sculpture at the southern entrance to the city by sculptor and native son, Sebastián, called "La Puerta a Chihuahua" ('The Gate to Chihuahua').	151 (46)	0	1998
9	Corporativo Vetro		(41)	10	2015
N/A=	Cathedral of Chihuahua	The cathedral during daytime	131 (40)	-	1826
10=	del real hotel		131 (40)	10	1949
11=	punto alto 2		131 (40)	9	2002
12	guizar building		127 (39)	11	-
13	banorte building		121 (37)	7	-
14	Courtyard by Marriott hotel		(37)	9	2015
15	The Lofts		98 (36.79)	9	2015
N/A=	The Angel of Liberty	The Angel of Liberty with the Government Palace in background.	144 (35)	4	2003
N/A=	la puerta del sol		144 (35)	0	-
16	punto alto		111 (34)	8	2000
17	tribunales federales building		104 (32)	7	2001
18	scotiabank plaza		101 (31)	8	-
N/A=	the tree of life	A sculpture by Sebastián, at the northern entrance to the city. It is called "El Arbol de la Vida"('The Tree of Life').	98 (30)	0	-
19=	PIT3 Technology Park	PIT3 Technology Park.	98 (30)	10	2013
20=	A.CH.B building		98 (30)	8	-
21	punto alto 4		(28.61)	7	2014
22	31 cero seis plaza		(28.61)	7	2014
23	fiesta inn hotel		89 (27.29)	7	1993
24	Westin Soberano hotel		88 (27.10)	6	-
25	roma building		86 (26.5)	6	-
26	Holiday Inn Hotel & Suites Chihuahua		(26)	8	2015
27	corporativo roma		80 (24.6)	6	-
N/A	Asta bandera		75 (23)	0	2013
28	banobras building		75 (23)	6	-
N/A	monument tower		68 (21)	0	2011
29	Vistas del Reliz		(20.44)	5	-
N/A	mirador tower		65 (20)	5	-

=== Approved or under construction ===
Rank	Name	Height ft (m)	Floors	Year
1	Staybridge suites	(26)	8	2015
2	aloft hotel	(22)	-	-
