= Museo Casa Juárez =

Coordinates: 28.6386°N 106.0756°W

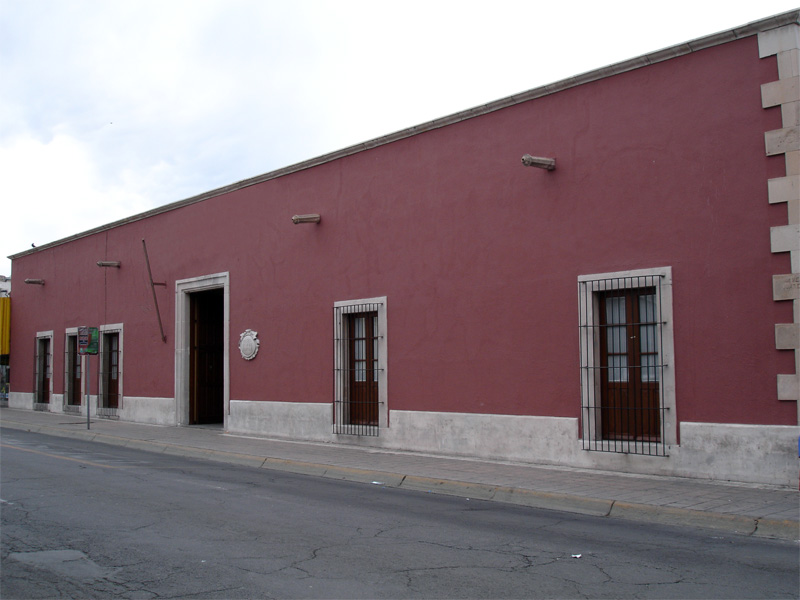
The 'Casa Juárez' Museum.

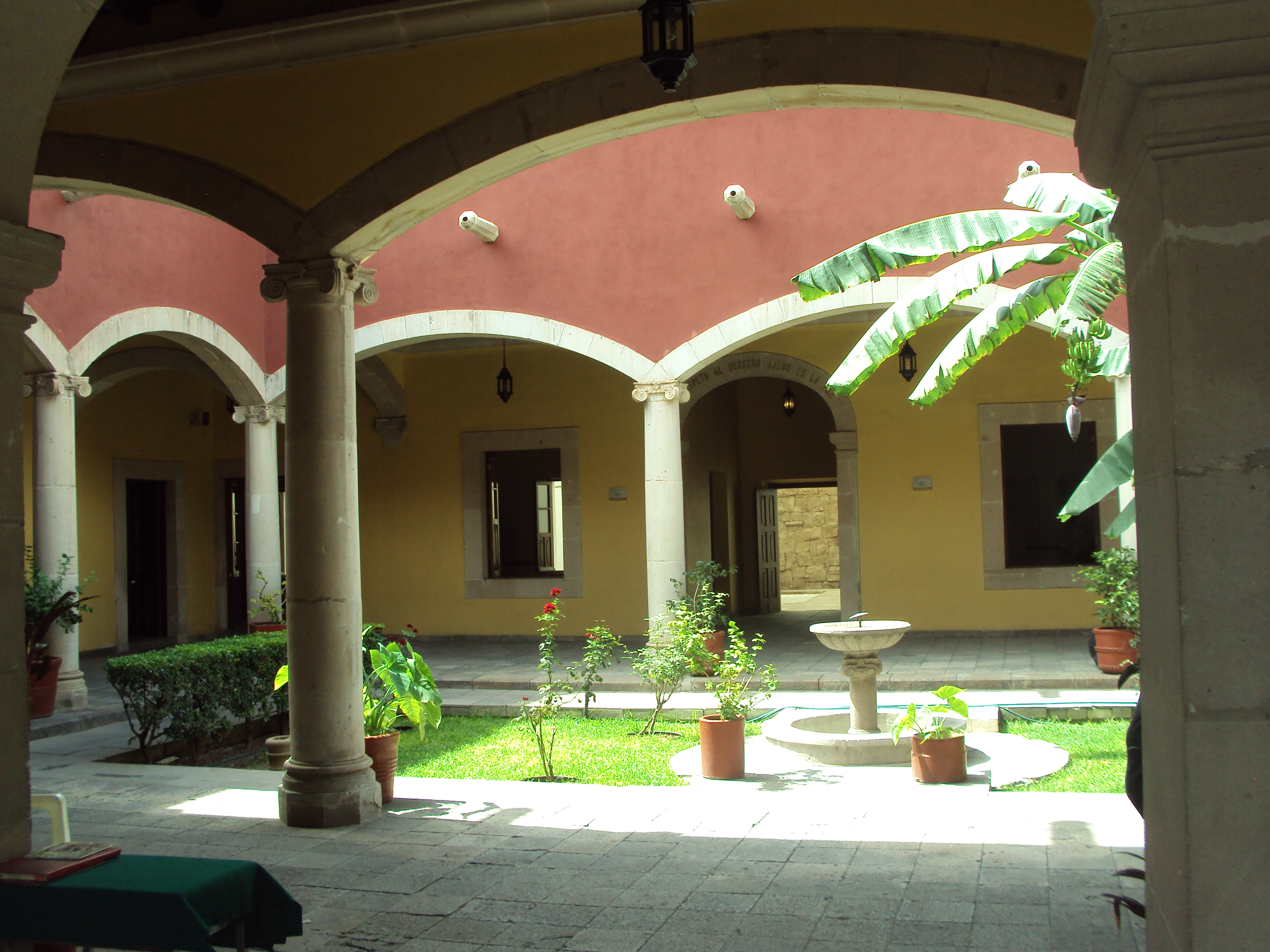
Interior courtyard of Casa Juárez Museum.

The Museo de la Lealtad Republicana (Museum of the Republican Loyalty), also known as the Museo Casa Juárez, is a 19th-century building in the city centre of Chihuahua, Mexico. It housed the constitutional government of President Benito Juárez during his stay in Chihuahua while Maximilian of Habsburg reigned as Emperor of Mexico, supported by the French, and was thus the de facto National Palace of Mexico.

== History ==
In 1826 the location was purchased by the state government to serve as the Palace of Government, a role it fulfilled until the new palace was inaugurated in 1892. On October 12, 1864, President Benito Juárez, fleeing from the French invasion, arrived in the city where he established his government-in-exile.

Juárez lived in and ran the constitutional government from the palace through December 1866. He left Chihuahua when the French forces and the Second Mexican Empire had been almost totally defeated. After that the building reverted to being the Government Palace for the state administration. However, when the new palace was constructed a few blocks away, the Casa Juárez was turned into an educational institution, first as the Escuela Municipal Nro 3 for girls, redesignated as Escuela Oficial Nro 140, and then renamed Escuela Benito Juárez, a name it retained from 1926 to 1967, when it was closed.

In 1972, during the observance of the centenary of the death of Benito Juárez, the authorities decided to turn the building into a museum. Many objects and furniture original to the house had been lost long since; however, the state government was, during the years-long planning stage, able to recover original furnishings as well as period pieces similar to those that Juárez had used.

In 2000 the restoration was complete and the renamed Museo de la Lealtad Republicana was opened to the public.

== See also ==
- Chihuahua City
- Museums of Chihuahua
