= Historic downtown of Chihuahua =

Downtown
- Community area
- Historic downtown
- Motto(s): Mi ciudad, mi Chihuahua, mi centro histórico
- Country: Mexico
- State: Chihuahua
- Municipality: Chihuahua
- City: Chihuahua

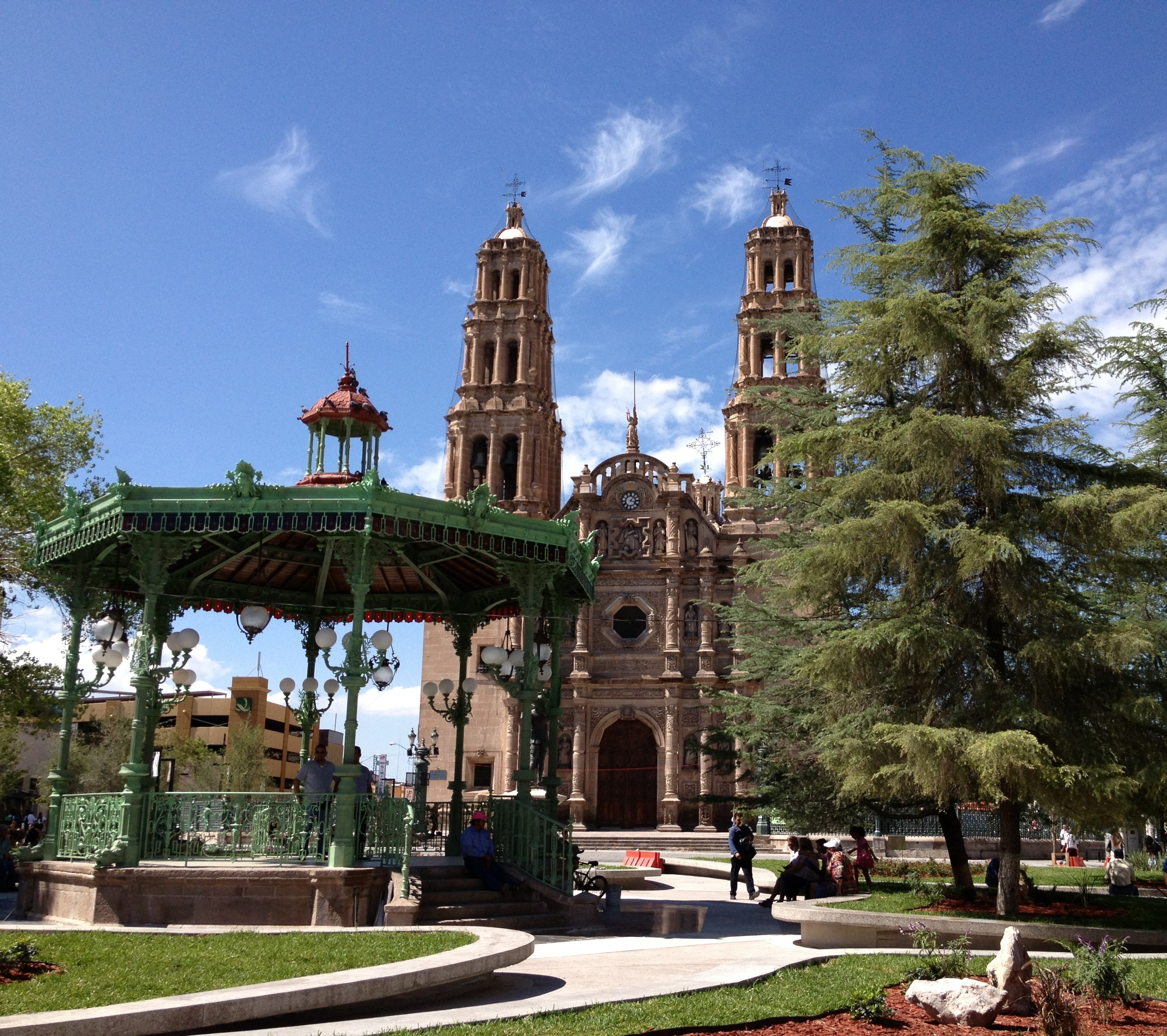
Cathedral of Chihuahua, 2013

Chihuahua's historic downtown is one of the most important business districts of the city. The downtown is home to a shopping hub called Libertad Street, and contains most of the historical landmarks of the capital city, including the Cathedral of Chihuahua, Museo Casa Chihuahua (Former Federal Palace), Museo Casa Juarez (House to the president Benito Juarez during a short period in the 1860s) and the celebrated Quinta Gameros, one of the finest examples of early 20th century architecture in the whole state of Chihuahua.

Starting in 2012 a huge project of regeneration began to change the Downtown's image, including a refurbishment of the main square, a tunnel and the closure of several streets to automobile traffic, opening a whole new pedestrian promenade, this urban phenomenon is usually called pedestrianisation. The first phase of this project finished in 2013, but further improvements are being developed, for example the opening of the Judicial City and the construction of a new Legislative see.

== History ==
Chihuahua was founded on October 12, 1709. Among the surviving buildings from this period we find the cathedral, the San Francisco Temple, the Santa Rita Church and the Aqueduct.

== Buildings ==
=== Museums ===
- Museum of Sacred Art.
- Townhall.
- Casa Chihuahua Museum
- Center of Municipal Development (CDS)
- Constitutional Museum.
- Government Palace of Chihuahua
- UACH main offices (Autonomous University of Chihuahua).

=== theatres ===
- colonial theatre
- Parinfo
- museums
