= Quinta Gameros =

Coordinates: 28.6322°N 106.0736°W

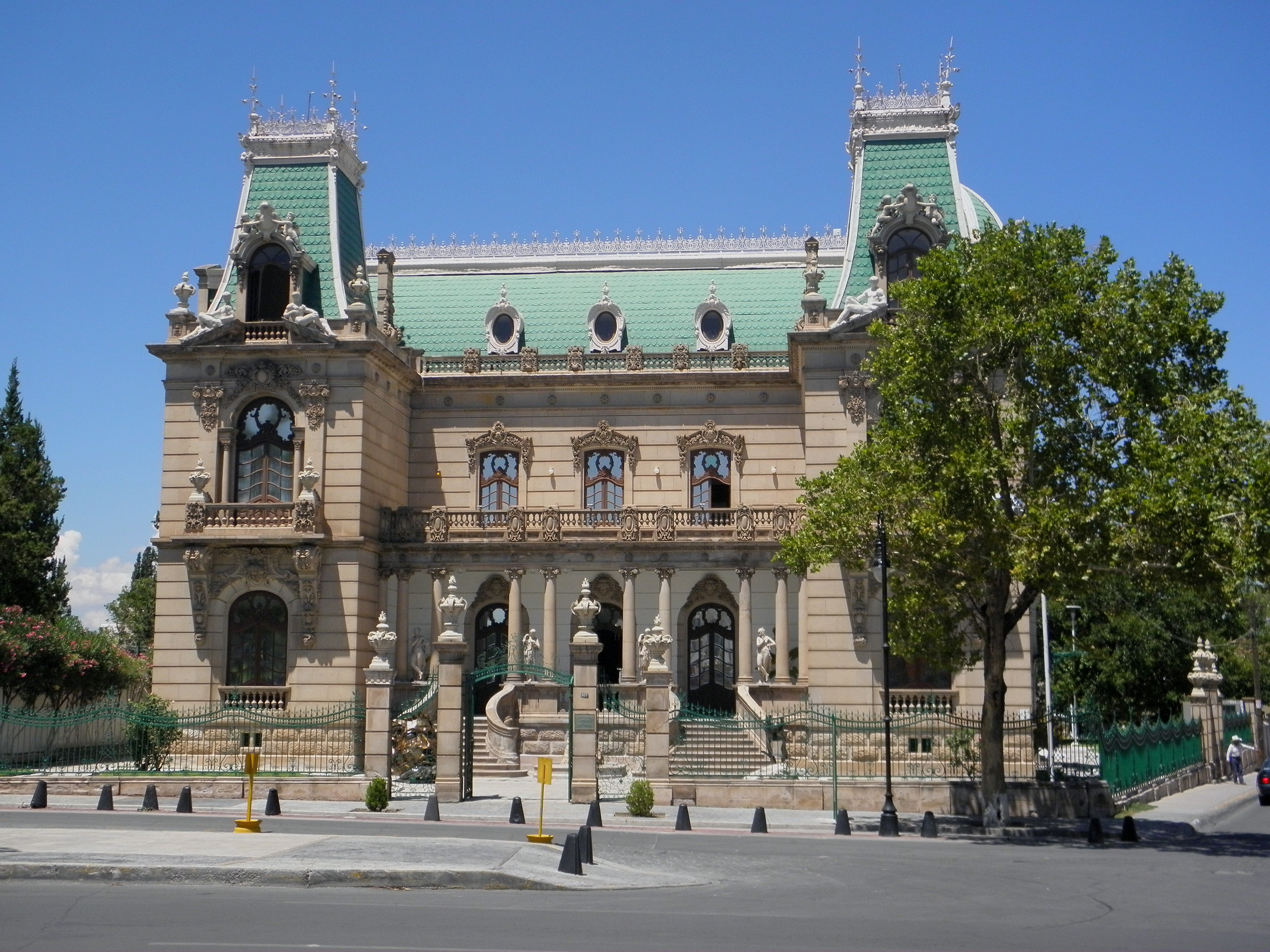
- Interactive map of the Quinta Gameros area

General information
- Type: Mansion
- Architectural style: Art Nouveau, Eclectic Belle Époque
- Location: Chihuahua City, Chihuahua; Mexico, Paseo Bolívar 401, Historic Center of Chihuahua City (31000)
- Current tenants: Centro Cultural Universitario Quinta Gameros
- Construction started: 1907
- Completed: 1910
- Owner: Universidad Autonoma de Chihuahua

Design and construction
- Architect: Julio Corredor Latorre

Website
- Official site

The Quinta Gameros (English: Gameros Country House) is a mansion in Chihuahua, Chihuahua. The building is an Historic National Monument of Mexico. Quinta Gameros currently houses the Centro Cultural Universitario Quinta Gameros, a regional museum of Mexico.

== History ==
The mansion was built for Manuel Gameros Ronquillo, a member of the Porfirian elite. Construction started in October 1907 and finished in November 1910, just as the Mexican Revolution was commencing. Gameros and his family fled to the United States in 1913. Afterwards, Francisco Villa assumed the Governorship of Chihuahua and set out to redistribute the property of opposition families, including the Gameros'. Quinta Gameros was given to Venustiano Carranza as his personal residence and office in April 1914. Following a dispute with Villa, Carranza left the city and the Quinta Gameros would go on to be used for various purposes during the war, including as government offices and as a military hospital.

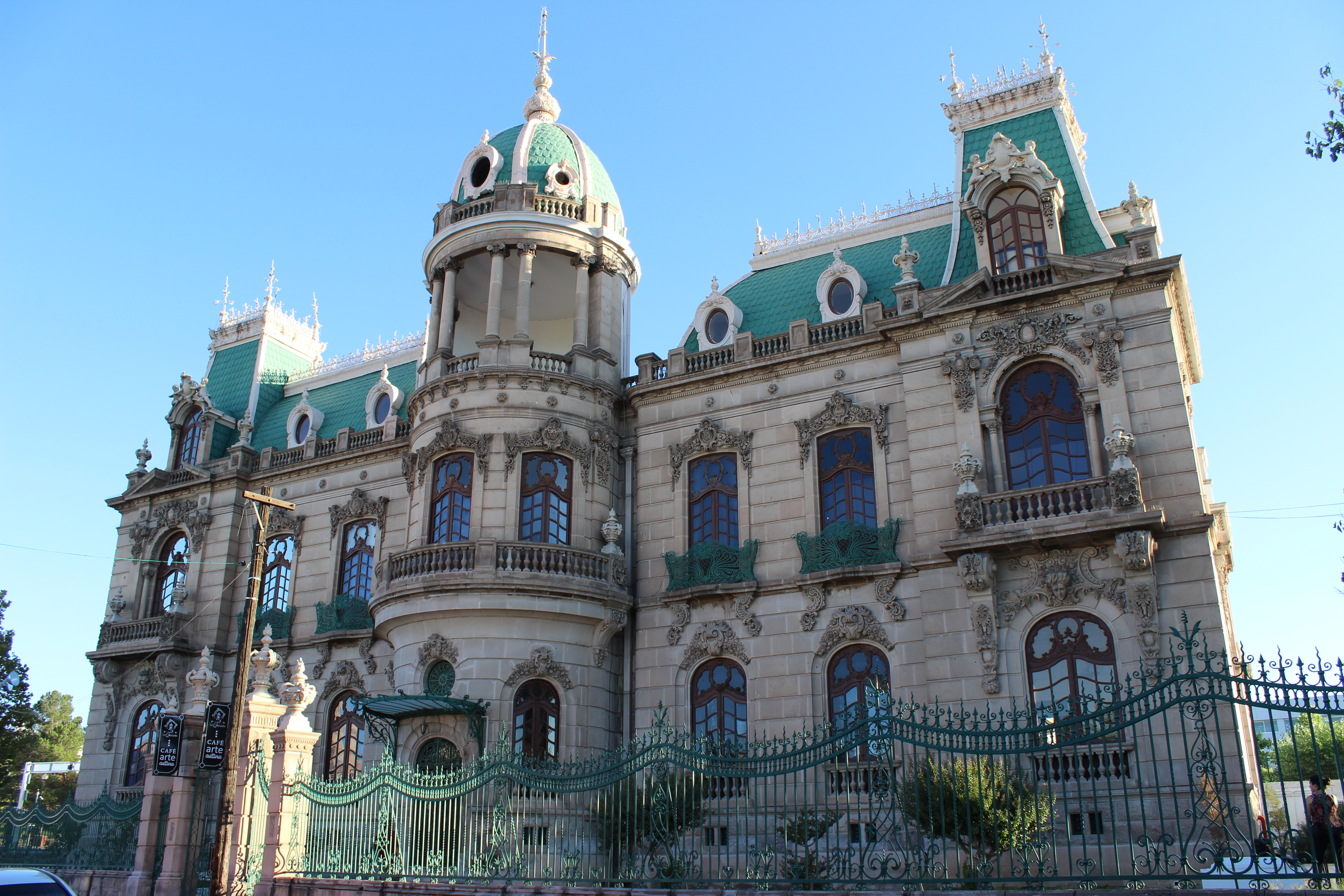
Side view of the building.

In 1921, the government of President Álvaro Obregón returned many of the confiscated properties to their former owners. The Gameros family returned and occupied the residence until 1926, when it was sold to the Government of the State of Chihuahua. The state government used the building as tribunal for the State Supreme Court and as offices for the Department of Education. As a result, the building was known as the Palacio de Justicia y Educación Pública.

On 8 December 1954, Governor Óscar Soto Maynez decreed the creation of the University of Chihuahua and earmarked the Quinta Gameros as the headquarters of the rectory and for the schools of Engineering, Law, and Music. A Museo Regional de Chihuahua was inaugurated on 22 November 1961 by President Adolfo López Mateos. On 19 October 1968, the University became autonomous from the state, and Quinta Gameros passed on to form part of its patrimony. In 1971, an agreement was signed between UACH, INAH and Pedro Fossas Requena for the Requena Furniture Collection to become a permanent exhibition. In September 1991, the Museo Regional Quinta Gameros became the Centro Cultural Universitario Quinta Gameros.

== Design ==
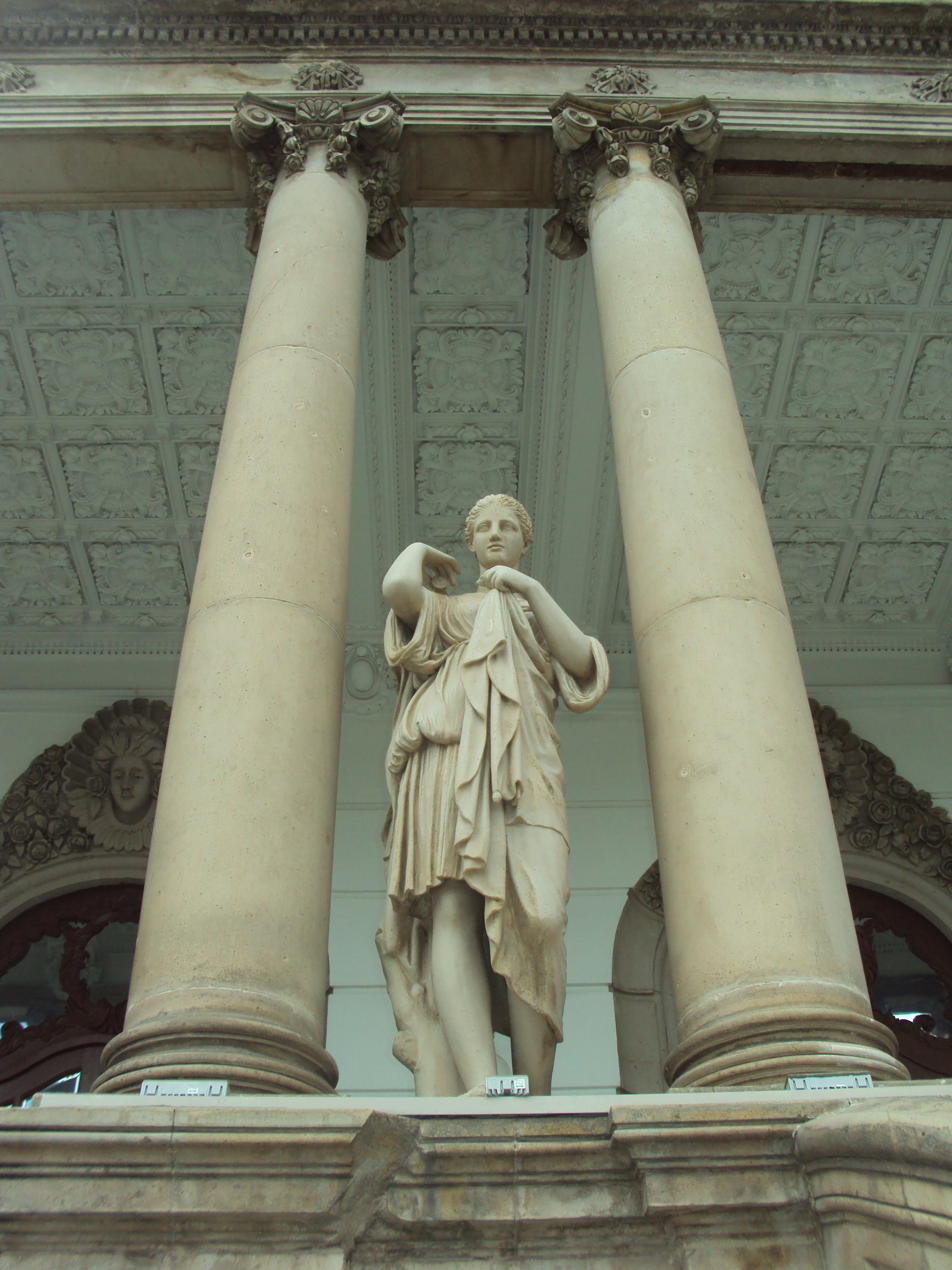
One of the statues at the main entrance.

The main architectural style is Art Nouveau. A Belle Époque mansion, it also includes details of Rococo, Beaux-Arts architecture and Second Empire architecture. The mansion was built by the Colombian architect Julio Corredor Latorre, in a French style popular among the Francophile Cientificos.

It is surrounded by gardens on three of its four sides. At the main entrance there are four female statues stationed between the columns of the portico. The two sets of steps leading to the main entrance frame a small fountain depicting fishing boys. The façade is composed of floral, animal and human details primarily made from cantera. The house has a semibasement, ground level, first floor, and garret. The building has a 10,760 sq. ft. floor area.

The ground floor has a double staircase and a Tiffany stained glass window. The main bedrooms, living room, dining hall and reception hall are on the first floor. The walls are decorated with oil paintings and the doorways with floral reliefs in wood made by European artists who were living in Mexico City. Both the ground and first floors have parquet floors. The house is filled with the Art Nouveau furniture from the Requena Furniture Collection.

== See also ==
- Museums of Chihuahua
