= Aarón Piña Mora =

Mexican artist (1914–2009)

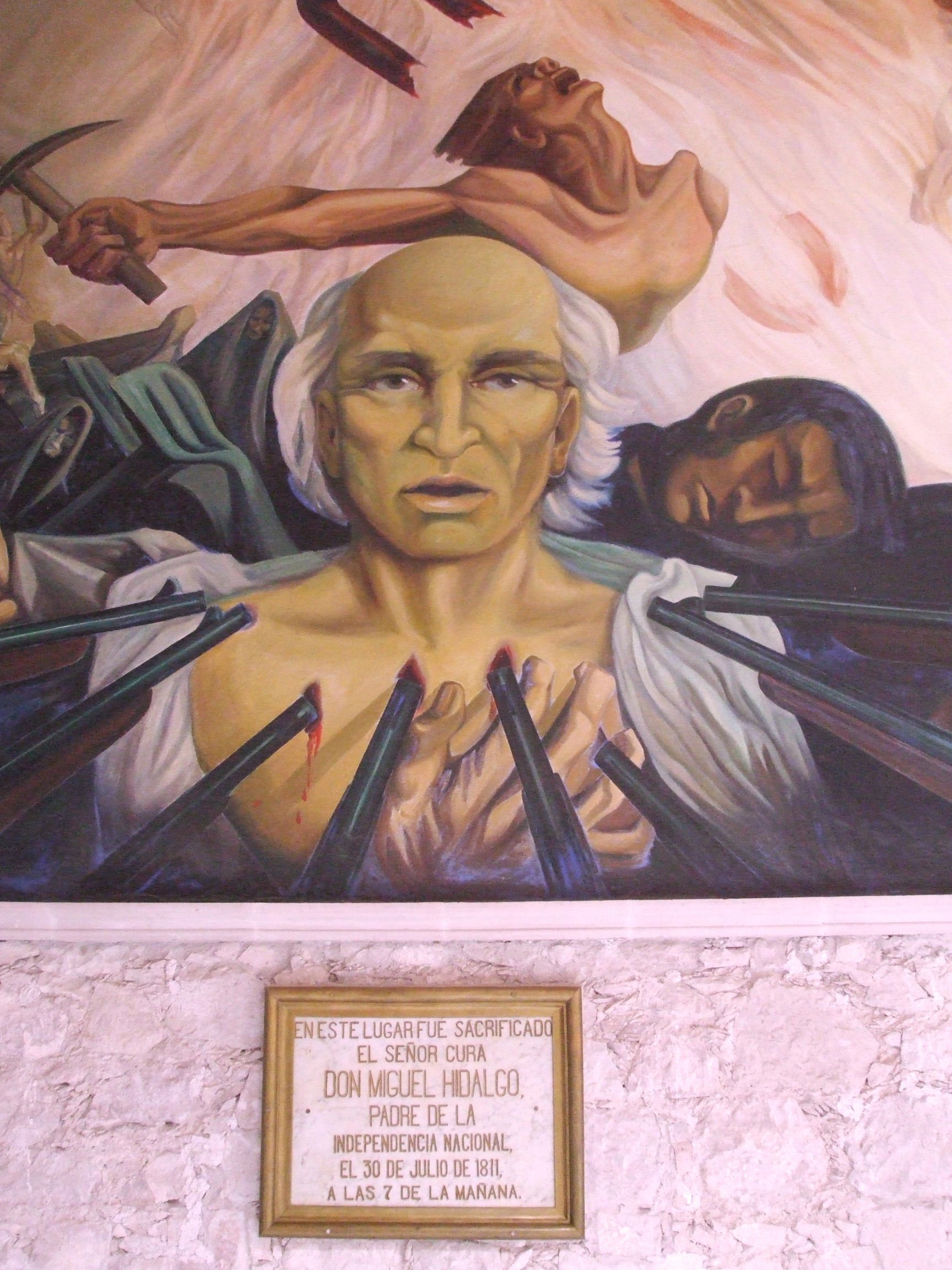
Miguel Hidalgo y Costilla mural in the Government Palace of Chihuahua

Aarón Piña Mora (1914–2009) was a Mexican painter and muralist.

He was born in Metztitlan in the state of Hidalgo, and moved with his family, at an early age, to Mexico City. From 1930 to 1933 he attended the School of Drawing and Sculpture of the Plastic Arts at the Public Education Secretariat. During the 1940s, he relocated to Chihuahua, where he further developed his skills as a painter. In 1954 he received a scholarship by the Ignacio Usle Fernández Foundation to study with Don Daniel Vazquez Diaz in Madrid, Spain. During that time he also studied technique in the Museo del Prado and attended classes at the Fine Arts Circle of Madrid.

In 1956 he organized the School of Plastic Arts of the University of Chihuahua and in 1958 became the Principal of the Fine Arts Institute of the same university.

His best known works are the murals in the Government Palace of Chihuahua, Chihuahua, Mexico, which cover the courtyard walls on the first floor and much of the second floor.

He received this commission in 1959 from Governor Teofilo Borunda, and when President Adolfo López Mateos visited the city in 1962, he inspected the first-floor murals, and urged Piña to continue the work to the second-floor as well. However, it wasn't until the 1990s that he completed the farming and mining panels on the second floor, and in a much changed, more mature style.

Piña Moras murals and paintings may also be found in the United States, Europe and Mexico, two of which are in the Teatro de Delícias, Delicias, Chihuahua and the Mora Independent School in Mora, New Mexico.

Piña Mora died on April 19, 2009, at his home in Chihuahua.
