= Government Palace of Chihuahua =

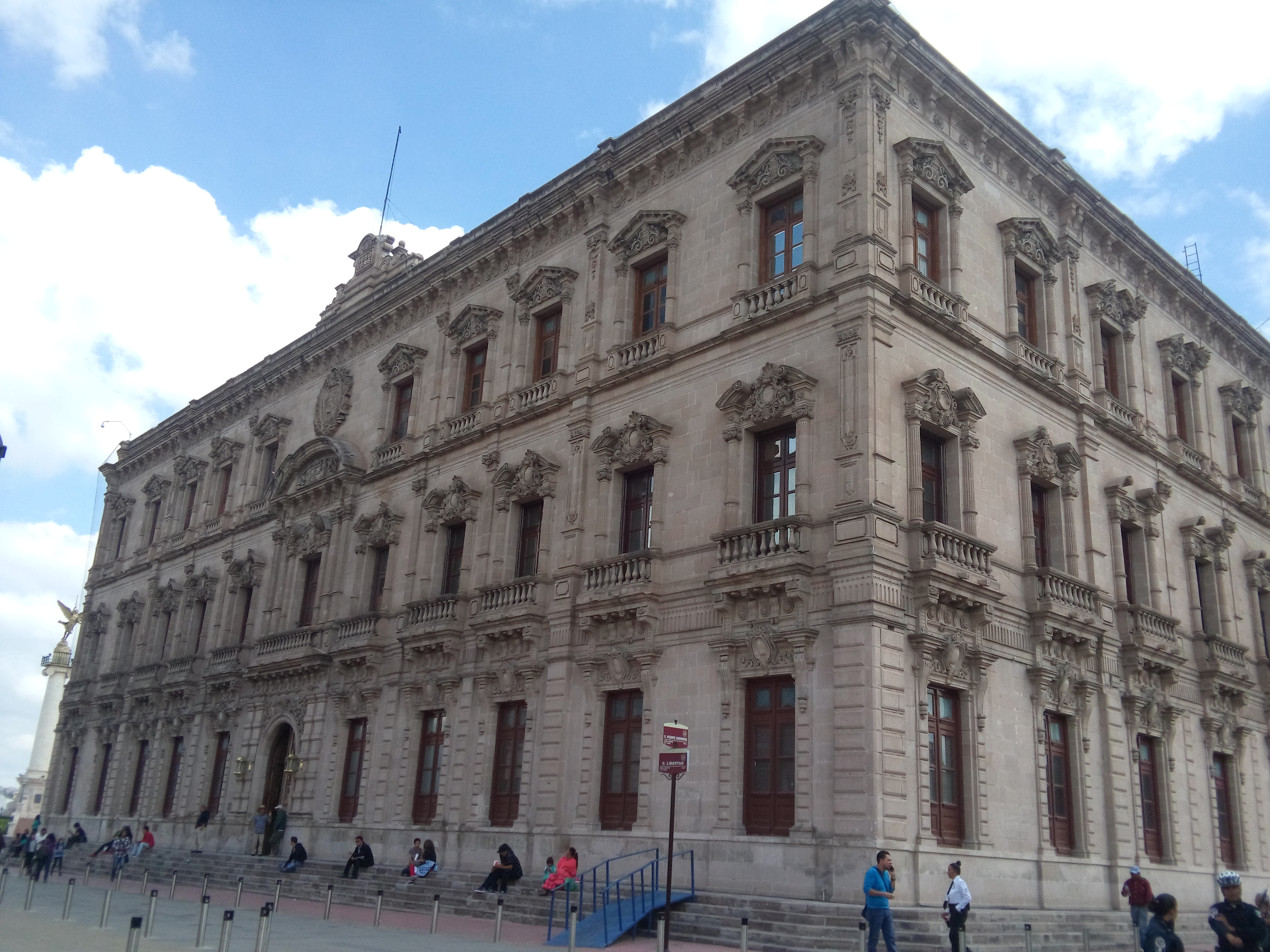
- Interactive map of the Government Palace of Chihuahua area

General information
- Location: Chihuahua, Mexico
- Coordinates: 28°38′21″N 106°04′24″W

The Government Palace of Chihuahua (Palacio de Gobierno de Chihuahua) is a 19th-century building in the city of Chihuahua, Mexico. Located in the heart of the city, it is of special interest since it houses the executive offices of the governor of the state of Chihuahua and, until 2004, the state legislature met here. The building is a landmark in the city as it contains a shrine commemorating the execution of Miguel Hidalgo, considered the Father of the Country, who died at the hands of a Spanish firing squad on July 30, 1811. The Altar de la Patria, or Altar of the Fatherland is located at the exact spot where Miguel Hidalgo died.

== History ==
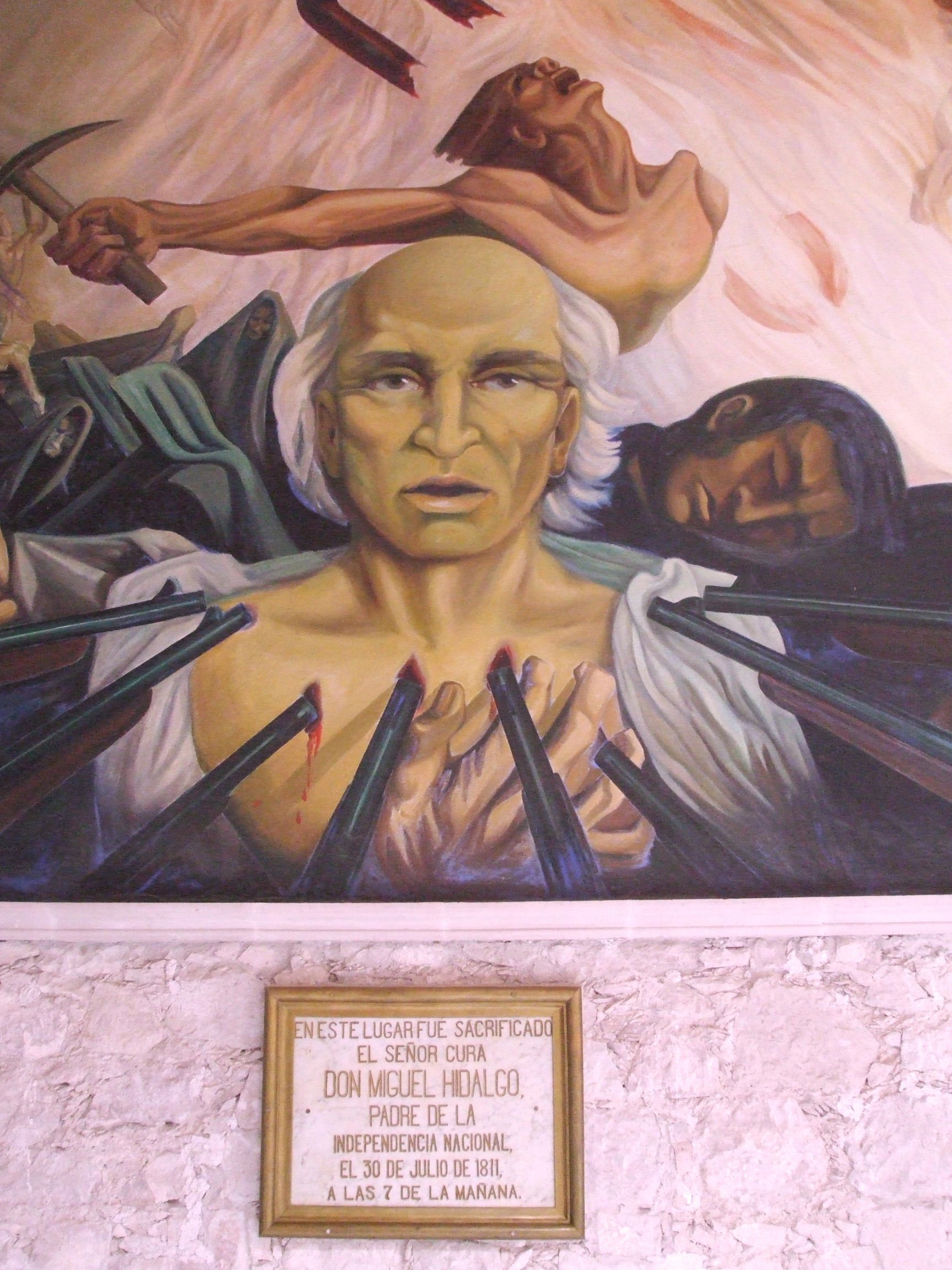
Panel of mural showing the death of Hidalgo, next to the altar

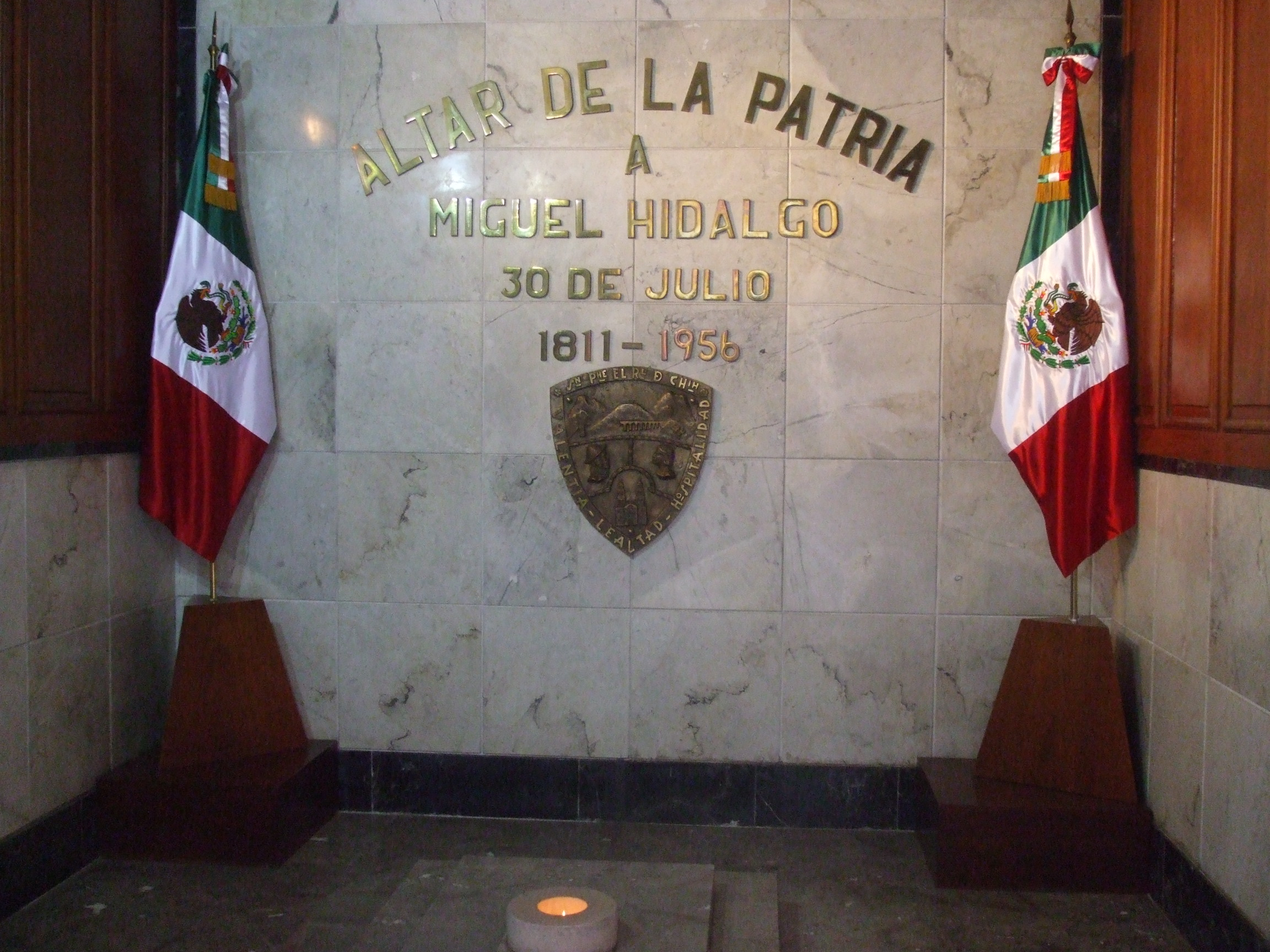
The Altar of the Fatherland; The spot where Miguel Hidalgo was executed by the Spanish.

Originally, a Jesuit College stood on the site. In 1767 the Society of Jesus was expelled from New Spain, and the building remained abandoned until it was converted into a military hospital in 1790, and was acquired by the Federal Government in 1859 after the Laws of Reform had been passed by the liberal regime of President Benito Juárez.

The old building was razed in 1878 after being turned over to the State Government, and the new Government Palace was begun in 1881 under the administration of Governor Luis Terrazas and placed under the supervision of Engineer-Architect Pedro Ignacio Irigoyen, with the assistance of Enrique Esperón and Carlos Moreno. A new street was opened and the old site of the Jesuit College was divided into two squares by Calle Libertad. The Government Palace occupies the lot south of Libertad, while on the northern side of the street stood the Chihuahua Federal Branch Mint, built after the demolition of the former college, demolished in turn in 1908, and is now the site of the Museo Casa Chihuahua, once the Federal Palace of Chihuahua, which was itself inaugurated in 1910.

It took almost ten years to complete the work, and on September 11, 1891, the building was ready for occupancy, being officially inaugurated on June 1, 1892, by Governor Lauro Carrillo. The palace had originally two stories and was built in neoclassic style from limestone. Its cost was put at $388,130.19 (pesos).

On Saturday, June 21, 1941, the palace suffered extensive damage by fire which gutted the structure; however, it was totally restored and a third floor was added, and the building was re-inaugurated in 1947. The project of reconstruction was done under the charge of Engineers Enrique Miller, Manuel O'Reilly and Carlos Ochoa.

In 1959, then-Governor Teofilo Borunda ordered the decoration of some of the first-floor inside walls with a series of murals illustrating the history and the economy of the state. Muralist Aarón Piña Mora was chosen to do the work and the first panel to be painted was the one illustrating the death of Miguel Hidalgo. When President Adolfo López Mateos visited the city in 1962 he recommended that the work continue. The entire first floor and part of the second floor are now covered with murals painted by one of Mexico's renowned muralists.

== Architecture ==
The palace is designed and decorated in the neoclassic style, with the first floor of the Doric order, the second of the Ionic and the third a hybrid style. The Patio Central was decorated with a sculpture which represents the four races of humanity; however it eventually was moved to El Parque España, one of the parks in the city centre.

In 2004 under the administration of Governor Patricio Martinez the Government Palace was restored and such features as the State Coat of Arms was added and the sculpture of 'The Four Races' was installed once again in the Central Patio. A statue of Miguel Hidalgo was also erected.

== Gallery ==
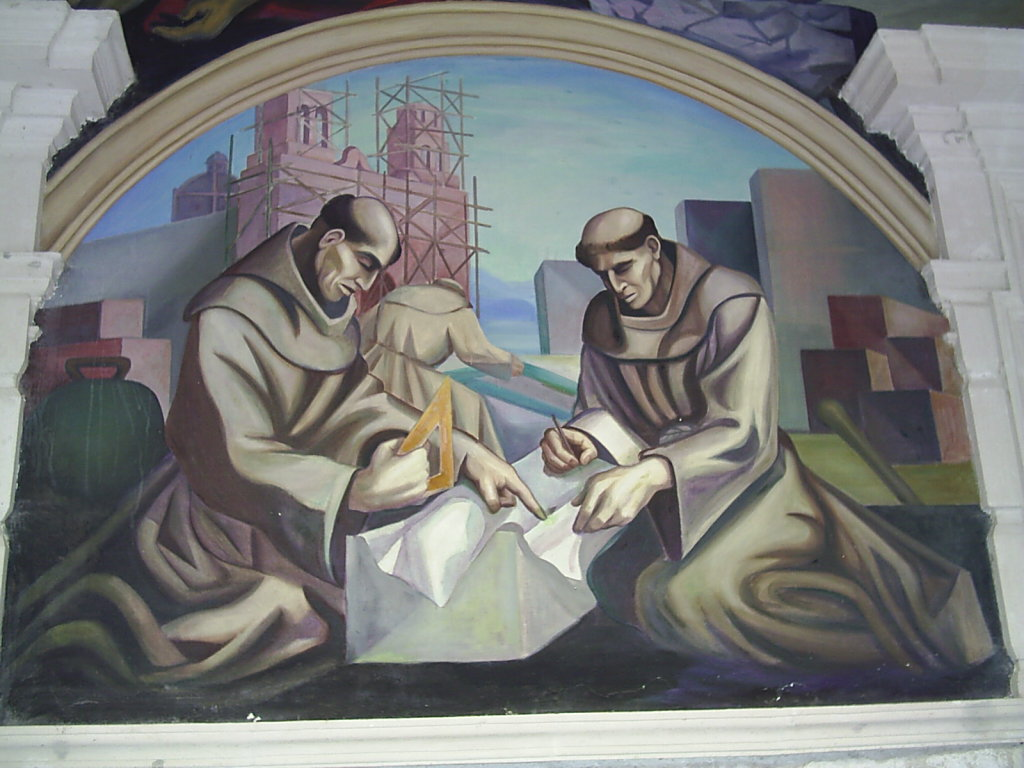
One of the panels illustrating the construction of the Cathedral of Chihuahua.

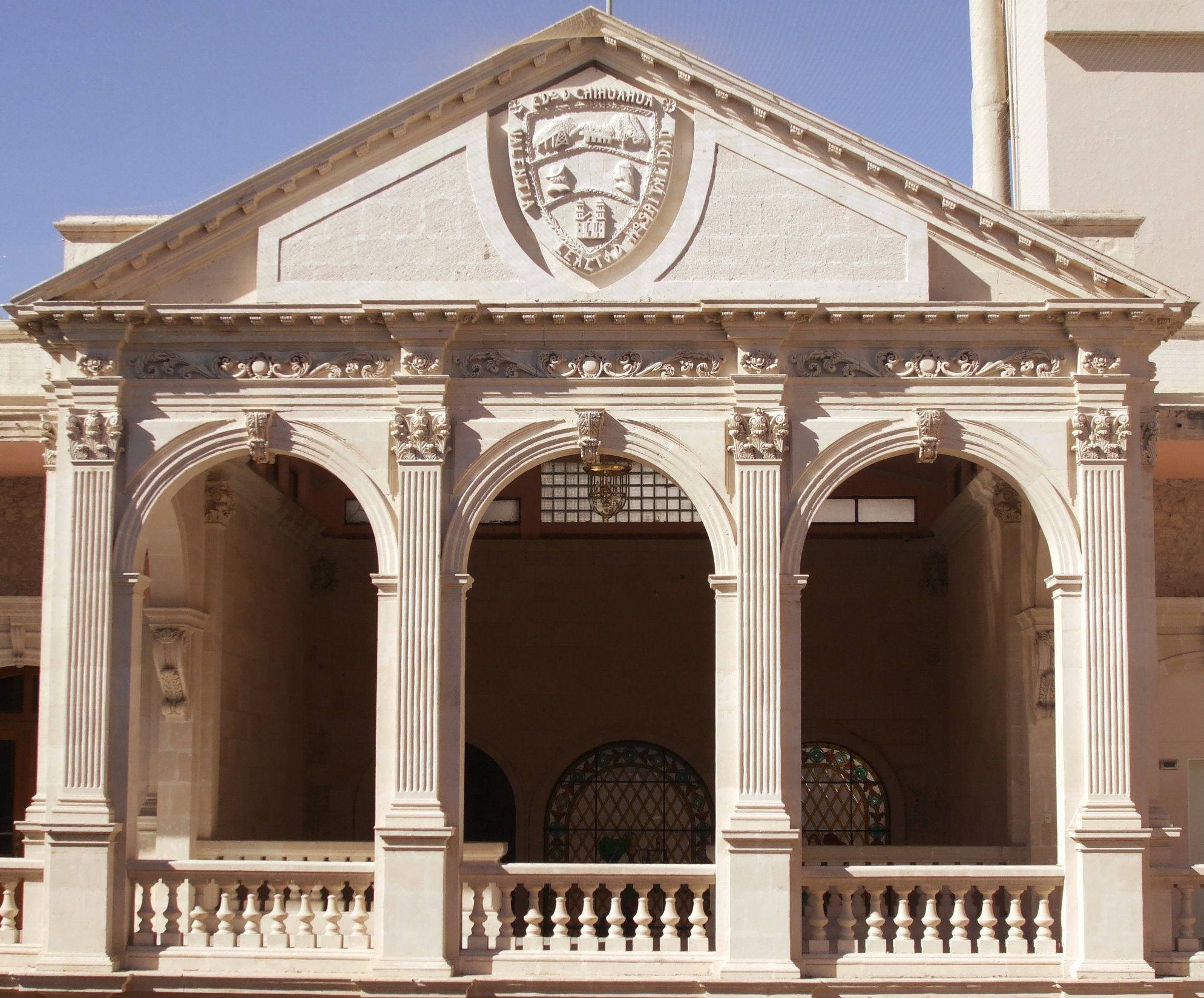
The Coat of Arms of the State on third-floor balcony.

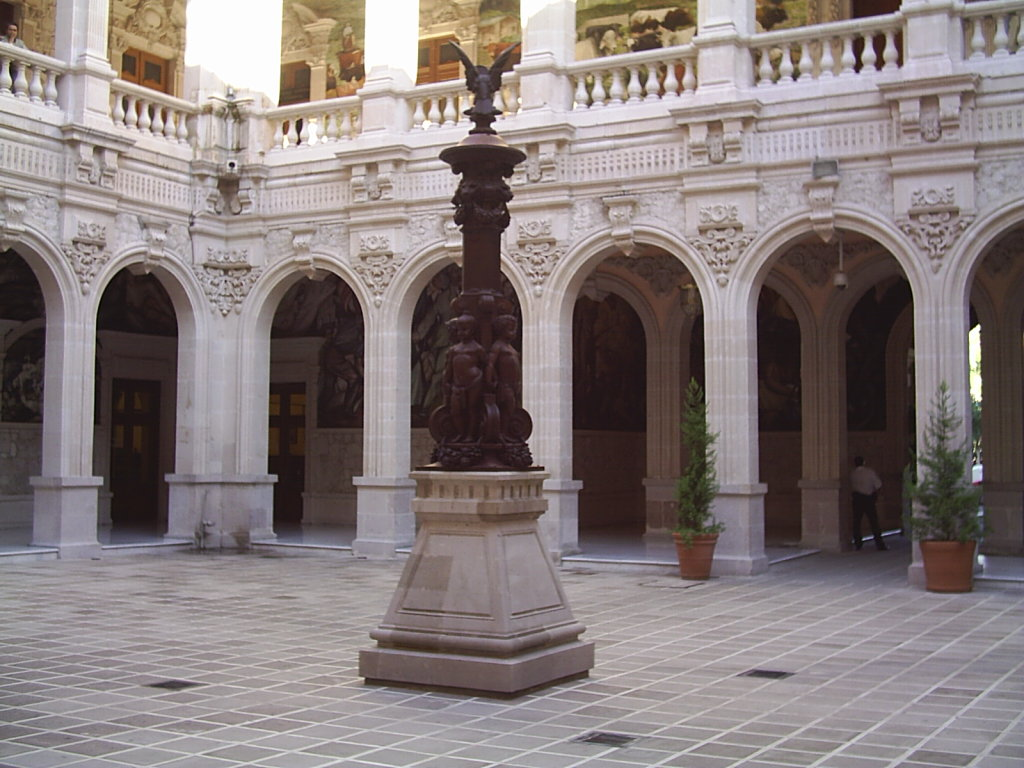
The sculpture of 'The Four Races'.

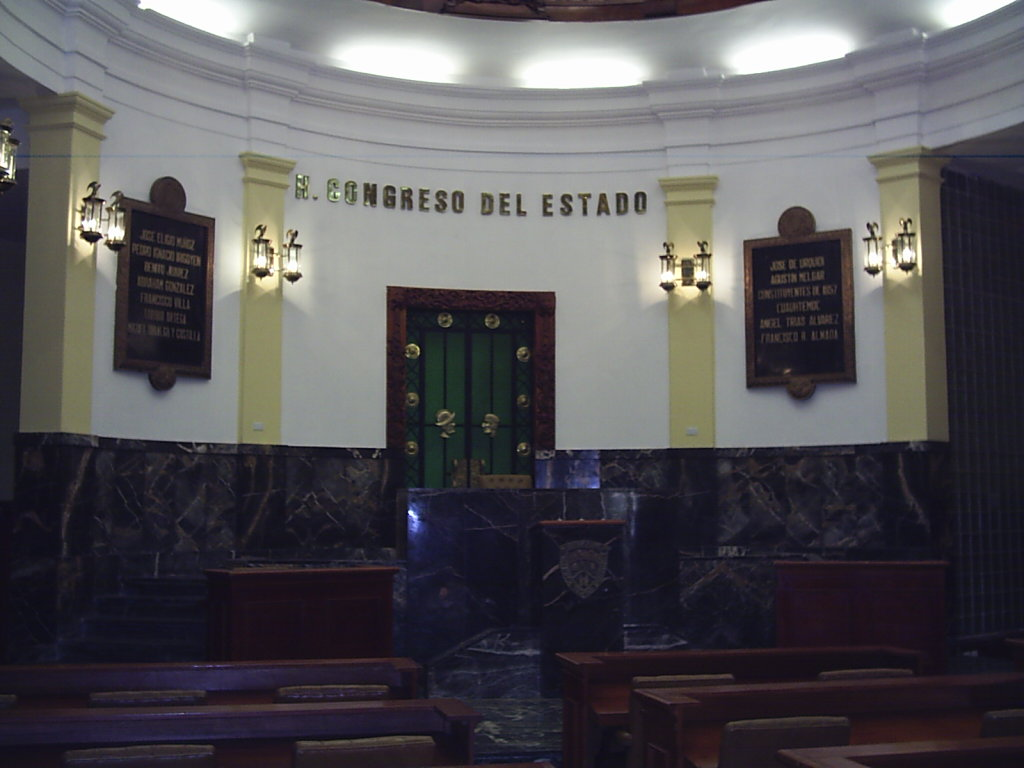
The original Chamber of Deputies inside the Palace.

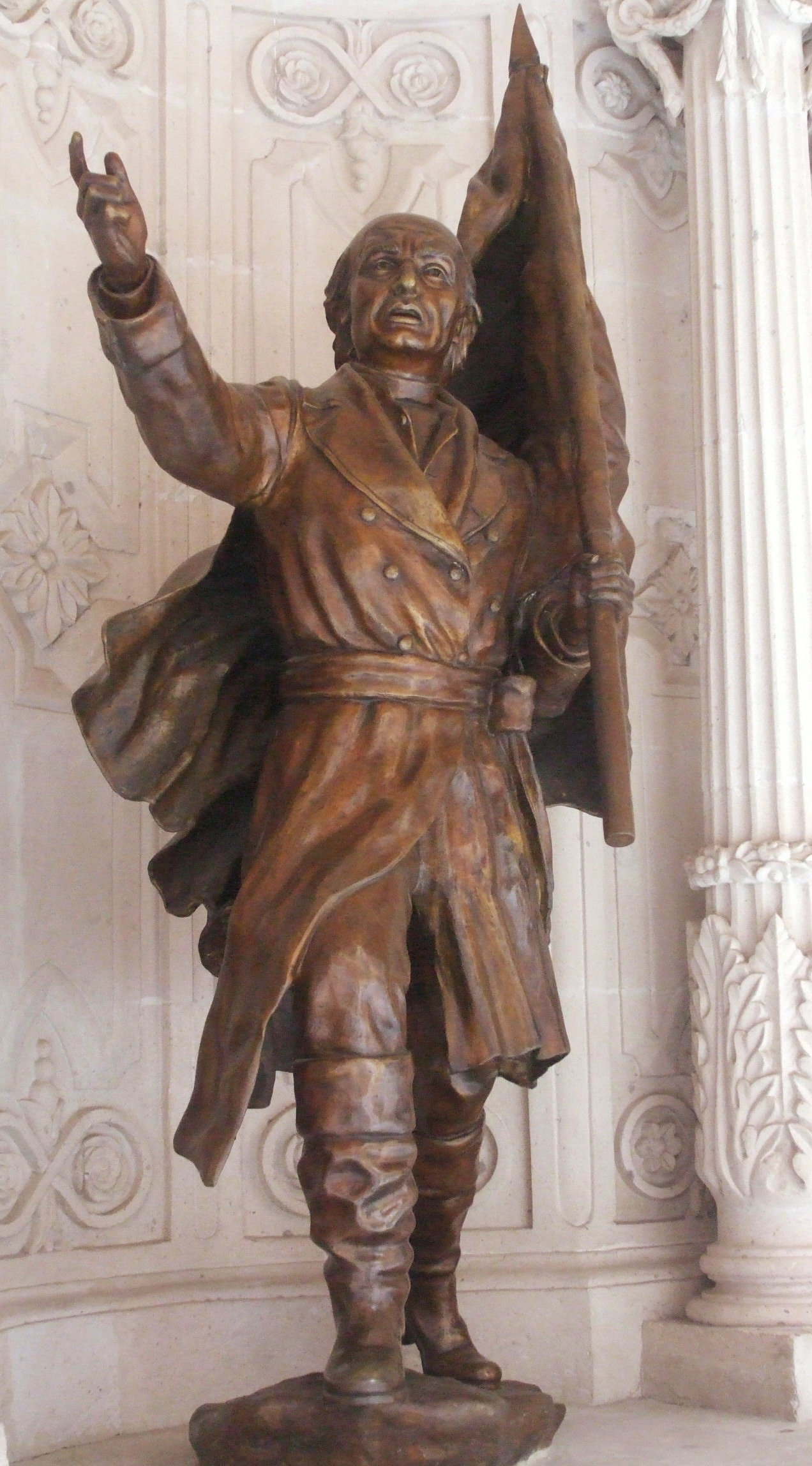
Statue of Miguel Hidalgo on ground floor.

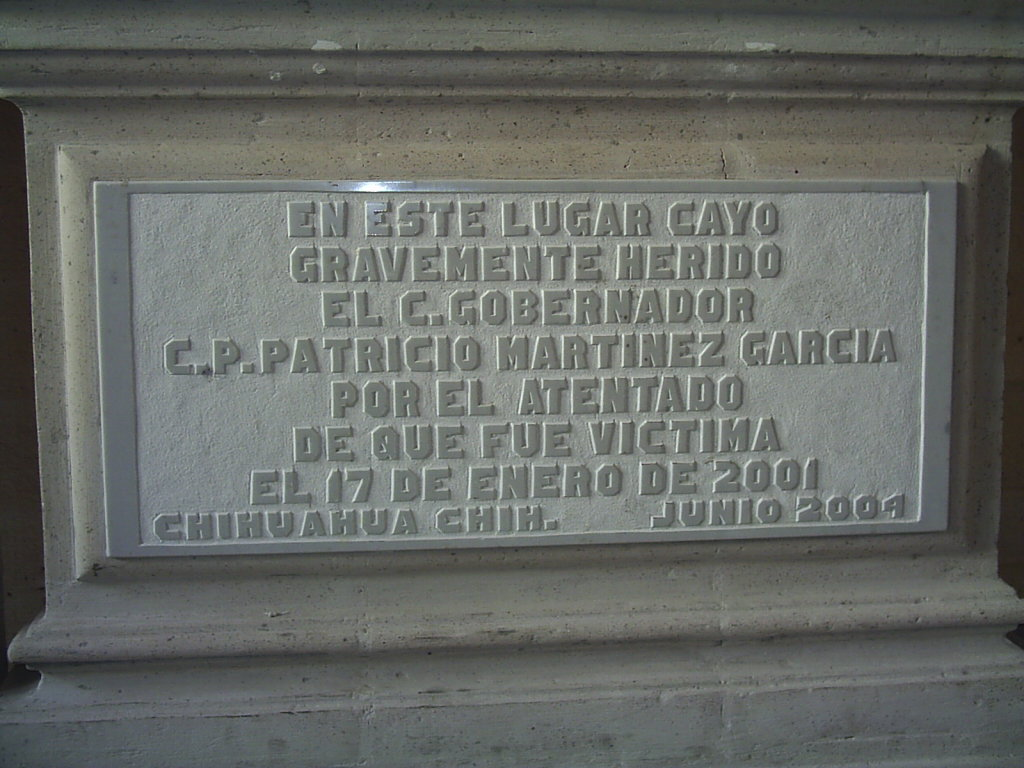
Commemorative plaque indicating the place where an assassination attempt was made against Governor Patricio Martinez.

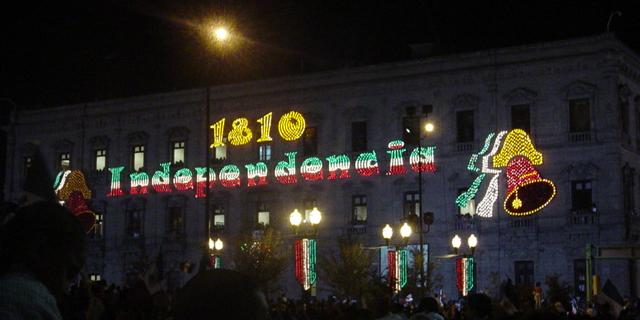
The palace decorated for Independence Day, 16 September.

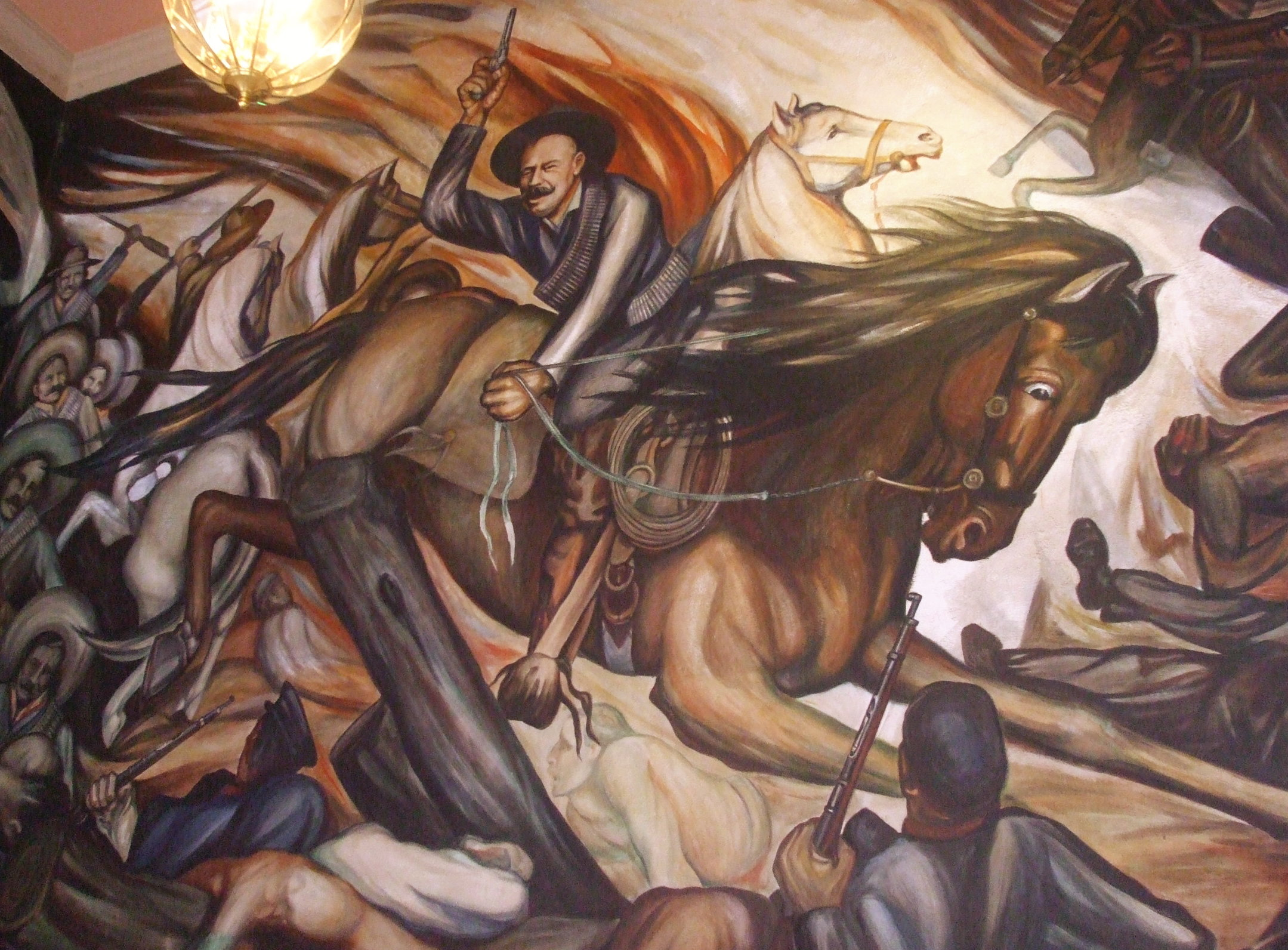
Panel with a mural of Pancho Villa.
