= List of the oldest church buildings in Mexico =

The following is a list of the oldest extant church in each of the administrative divisions of Mexico. The first place of Christian worship in what would become Mexico was in what is now known as La Antigua, Veracruz, founded by the Spanish in 1519.

== Aguascalientes ==
The Catedral de Aguascalientes completed in 1738. This cathedral is built on the site of a chapel founded in 1575.

== Baja California ==
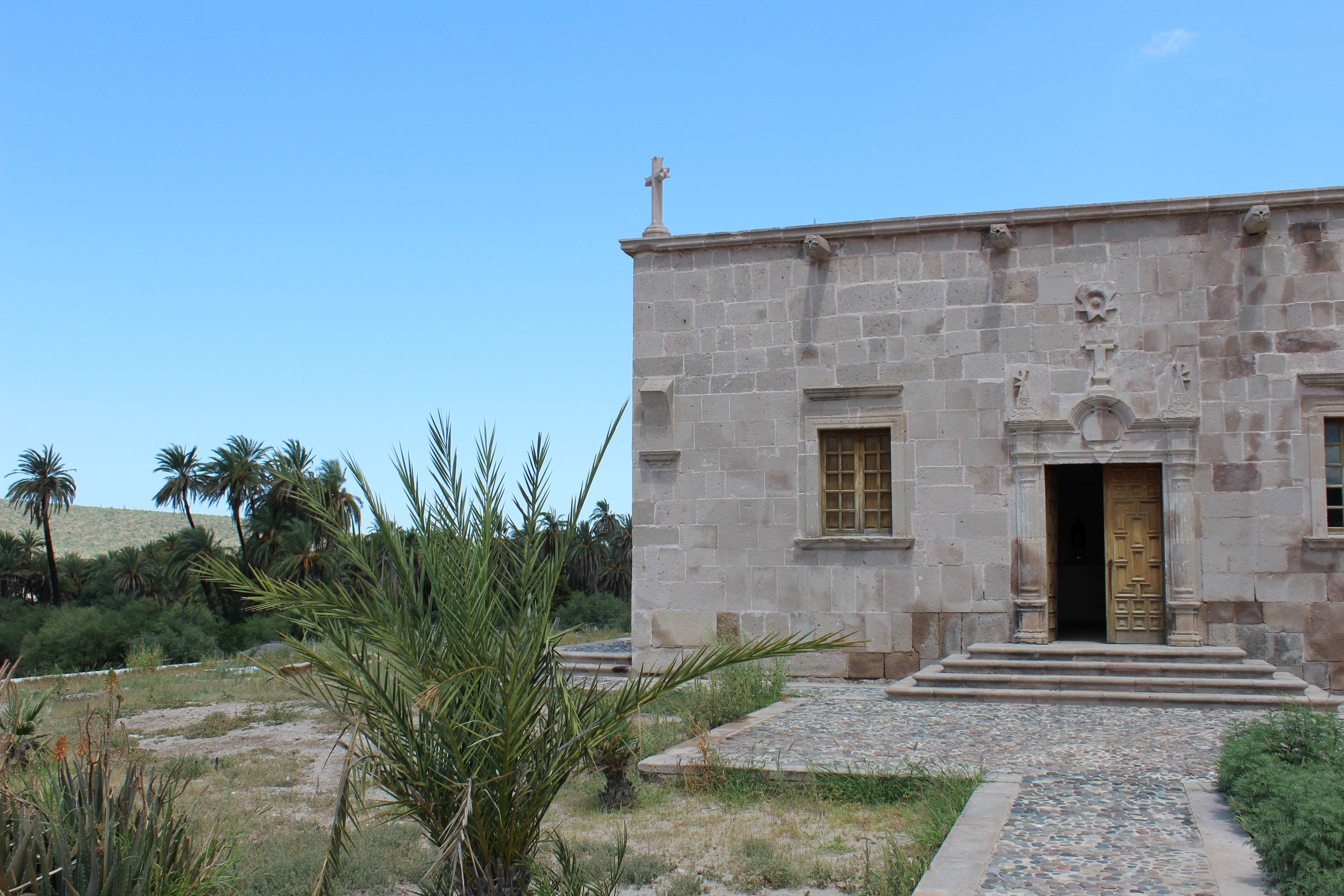
Misión Santa Gertrudis

The Misión Santa Gertrudis was founded in 1751.

== Baja California Sur ==
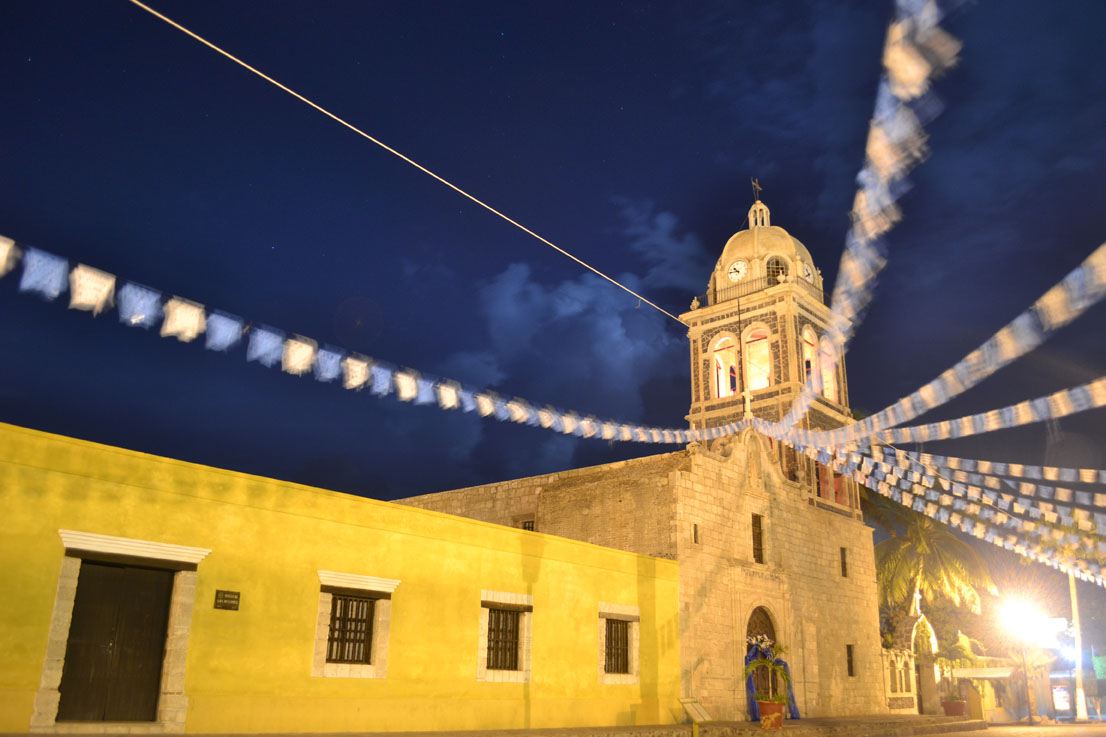
Misión de Nuestra Señora de Loreto Conchó

The Misión de Nuestra Señora de Loreto Conchó founded on 25 October 1697 is considered the "head and mother of all the Spanish missions in Alta and Baja California".

The oldest mission in the Californias was the short-lived Misión San Bruno, established in 1683.

== Campeche ==
In 1540, a church in honor of the Virgen de la Purísima Concepción was begun and it was built upon until 1650. It was expanded between 1758 and 1760. Another tower was added in 1850 and it was elevated to Catedral de Campeche in 1895 during the establishment of the Diocese of Campeche.

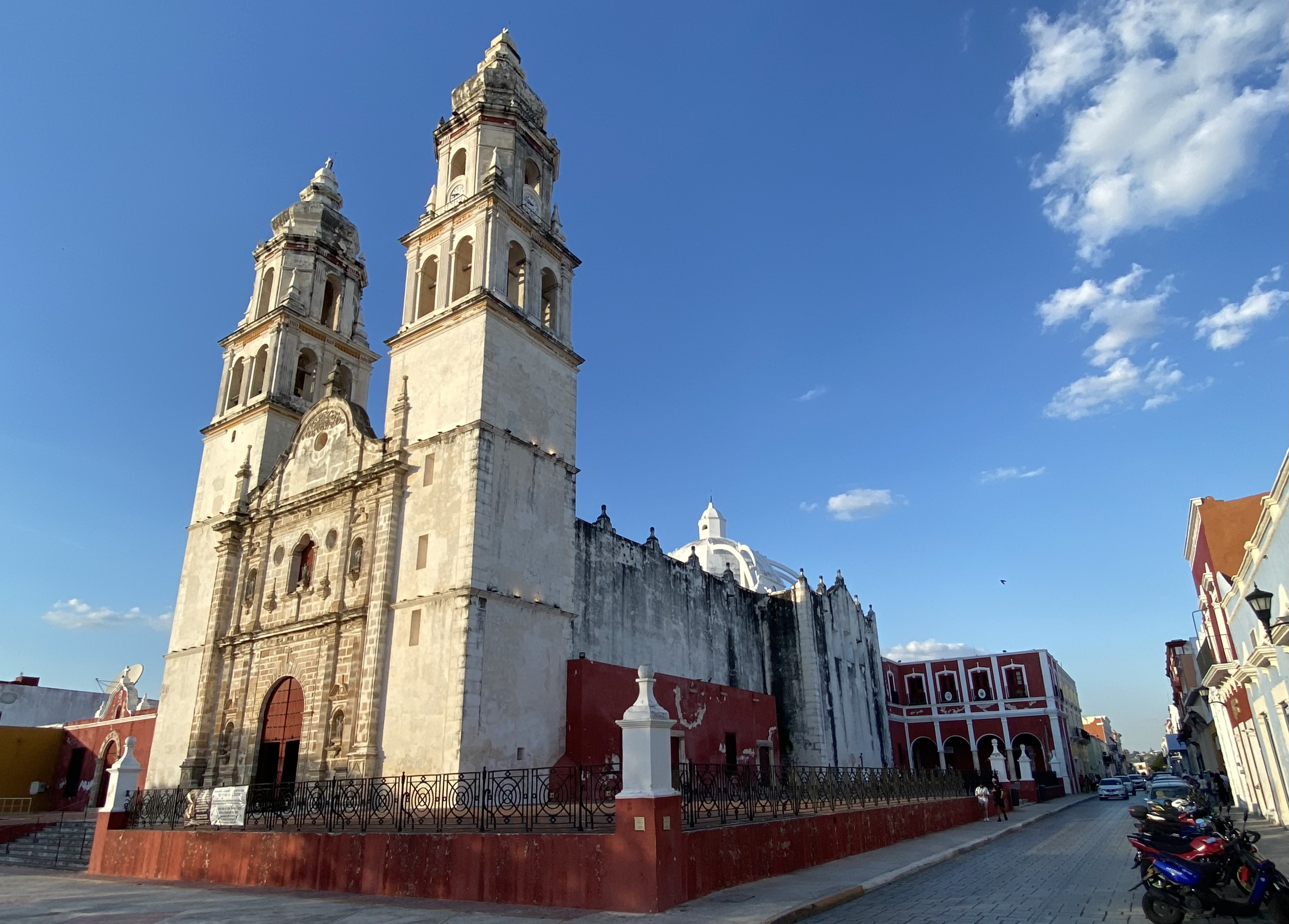
Catedral de Campeche

== Chiapas ==
The Templo de Santo Domingo de Guzmán in Chiapa de Corzo began construction in 1554.

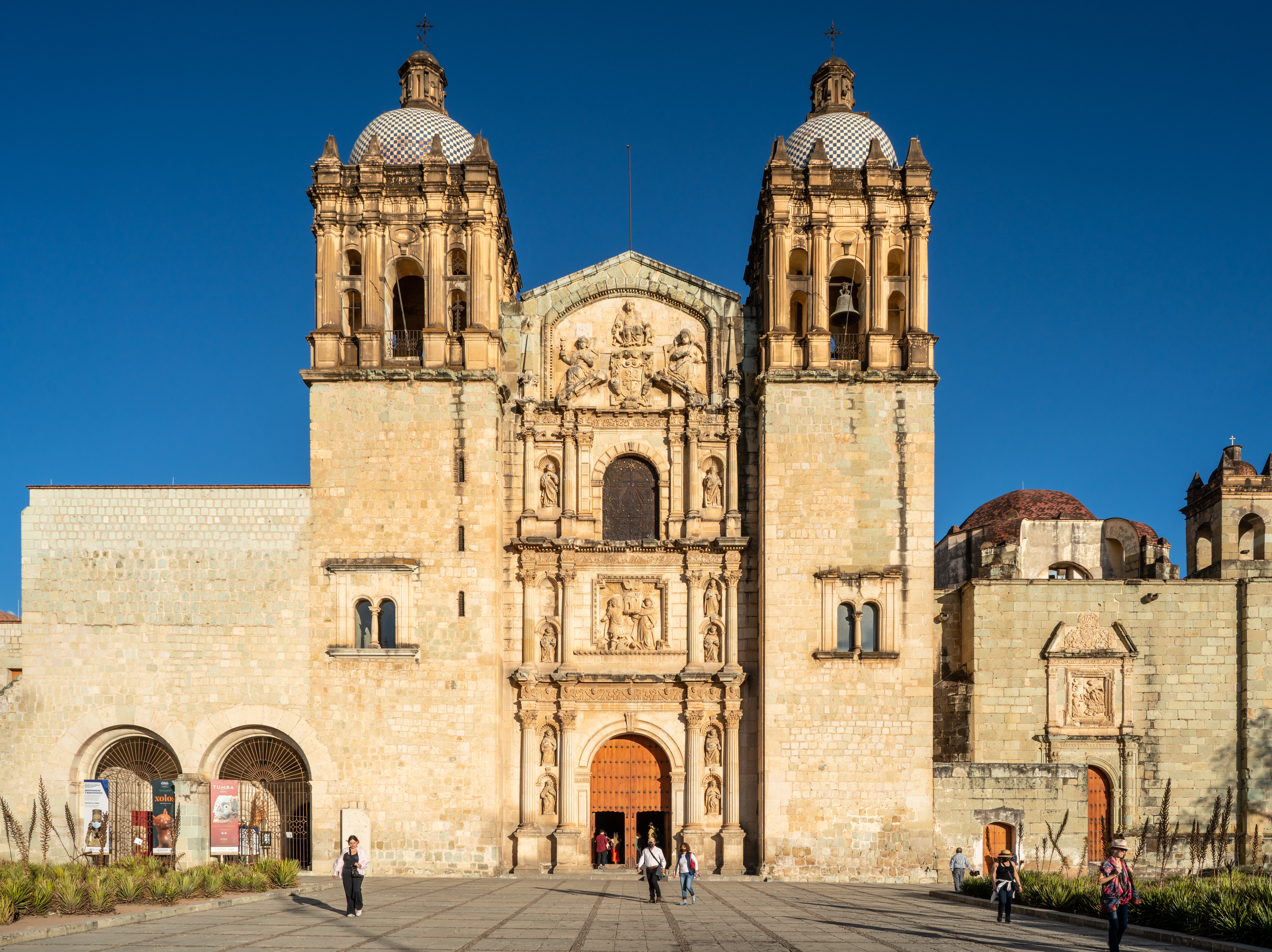
Templo de Santo Domingo de Guzmán

== Chihuahua ==
The Templo de San Francisco de Asís, built between 1721 and 1741, is the oldest religious building in Chihuahua City.

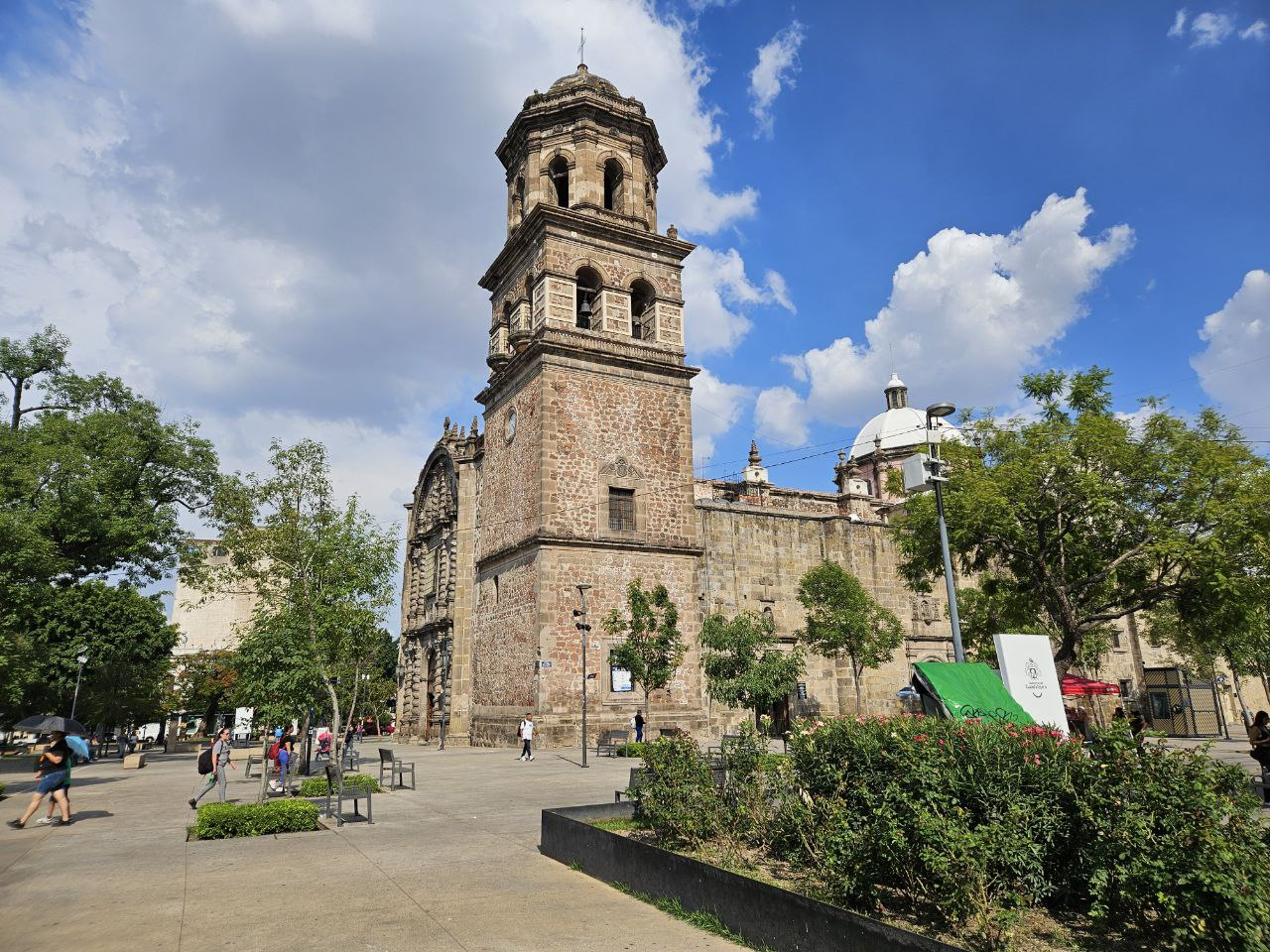
Templo de San Francisco de Asís

== Coahuila ==
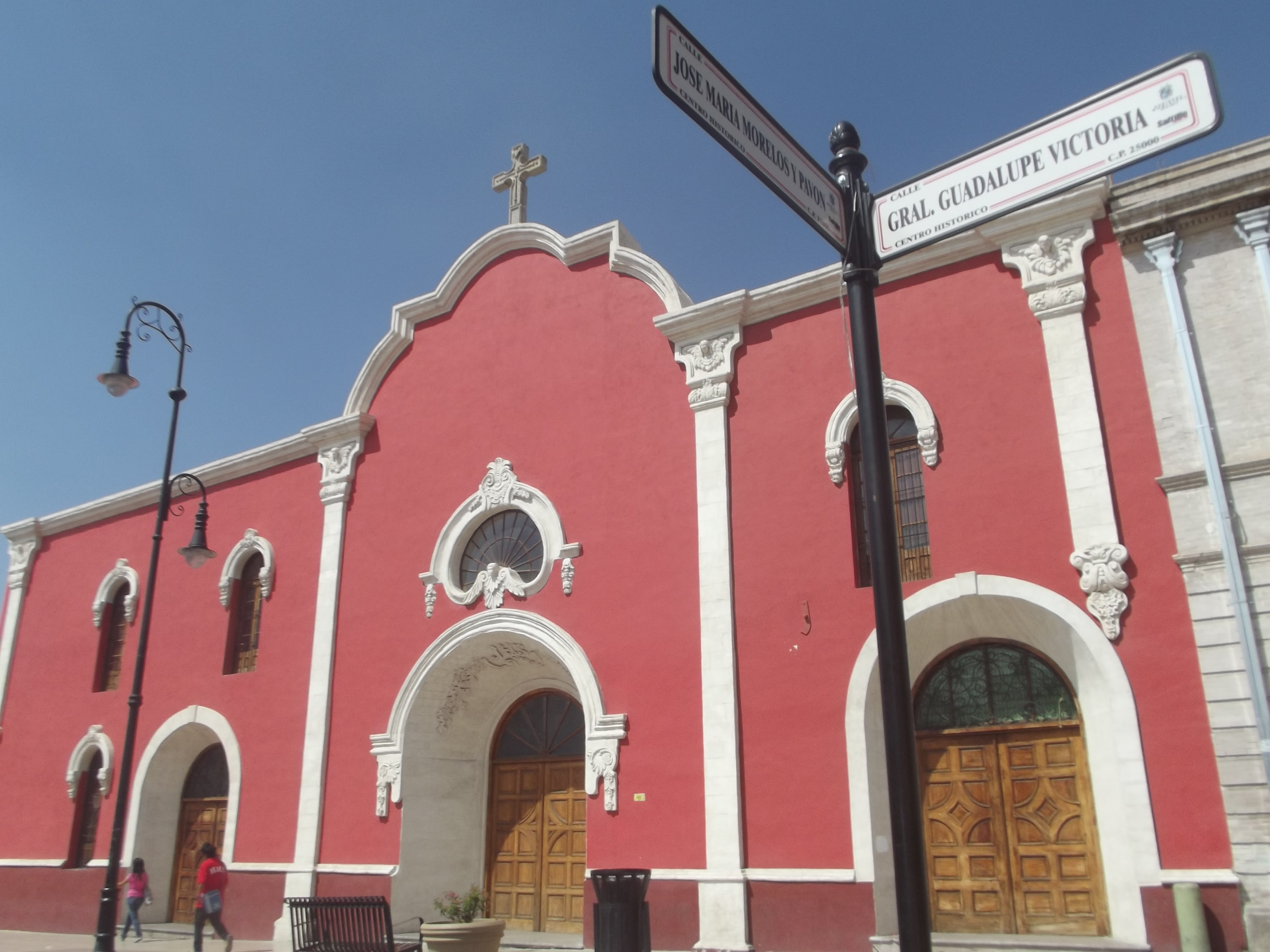
Templo de San Esteban

The Templo de San Esteban dates to 1591.

== Colima ==
The Catedral Basílica Menor de Colima. It has a precursor in a building constructed of wood in 1525.

== Durango ==
The Templo de San Francisco was completed in 1563. The building was partially ruined, but INAH approved its refurbishment. It is located in Nombre de Dios, the first settlement in Durango.

== Guanajuato ==
The Parroquia de San Francisco in Acambaro dates to 1532.

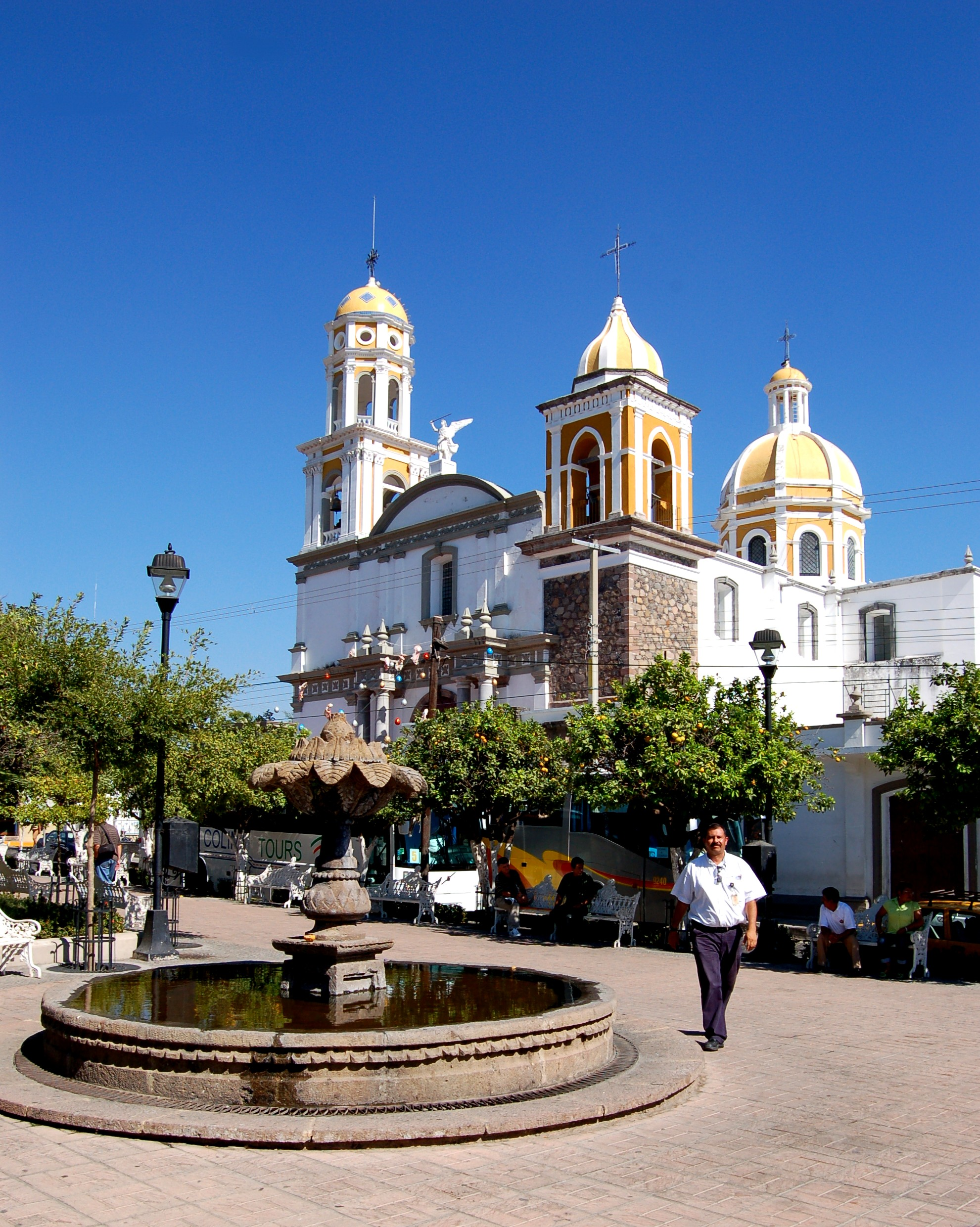
Catedral Basílica Menor de Colima

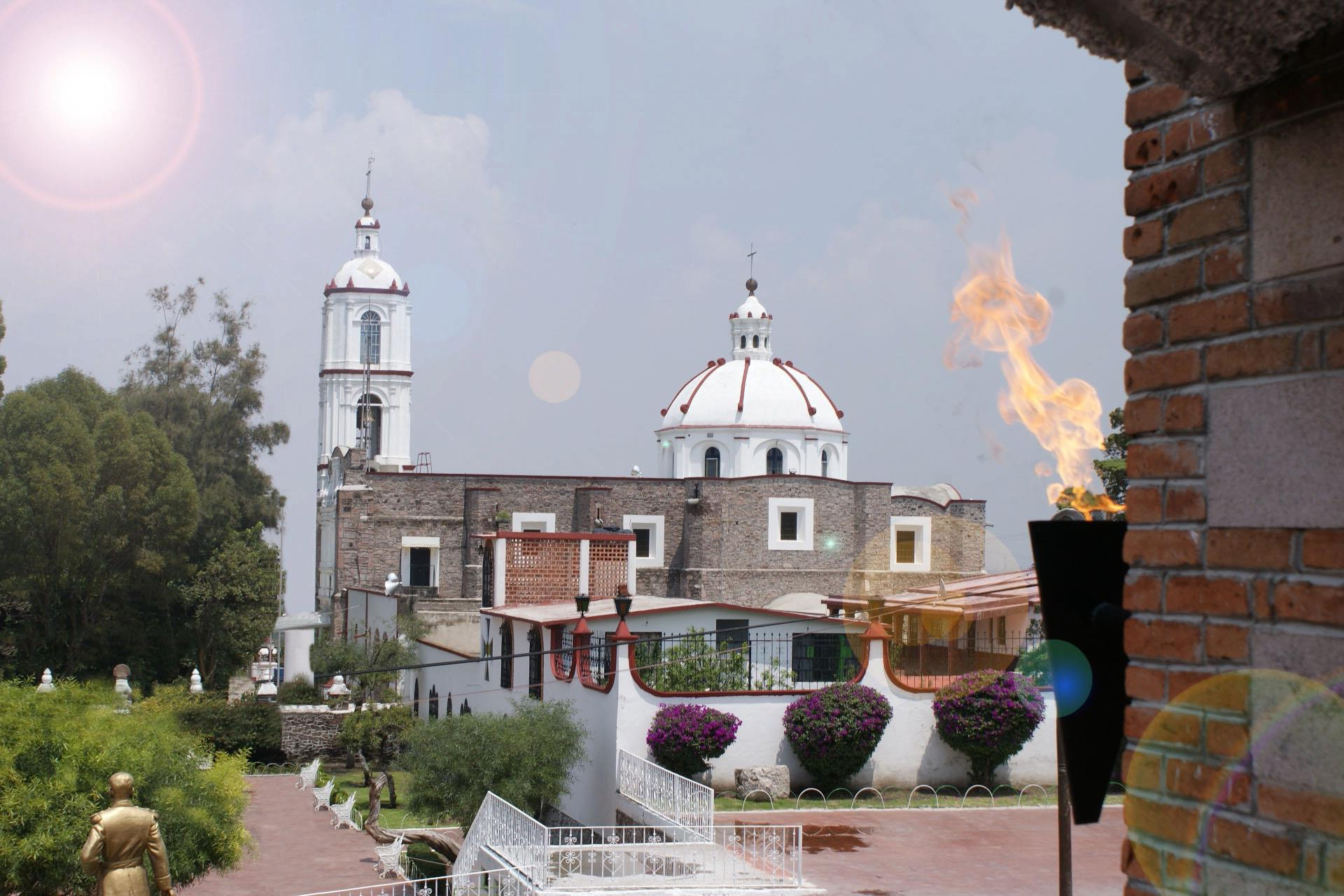
Parroquia de San Francisco

== Guerrero ==
The cathedral of Chilapa has a predecessor from at the very least 1533.

== Hidalgo ==
The Capilla de la Expiración in Tulancingo dates to 1526.

== Jalisco ==
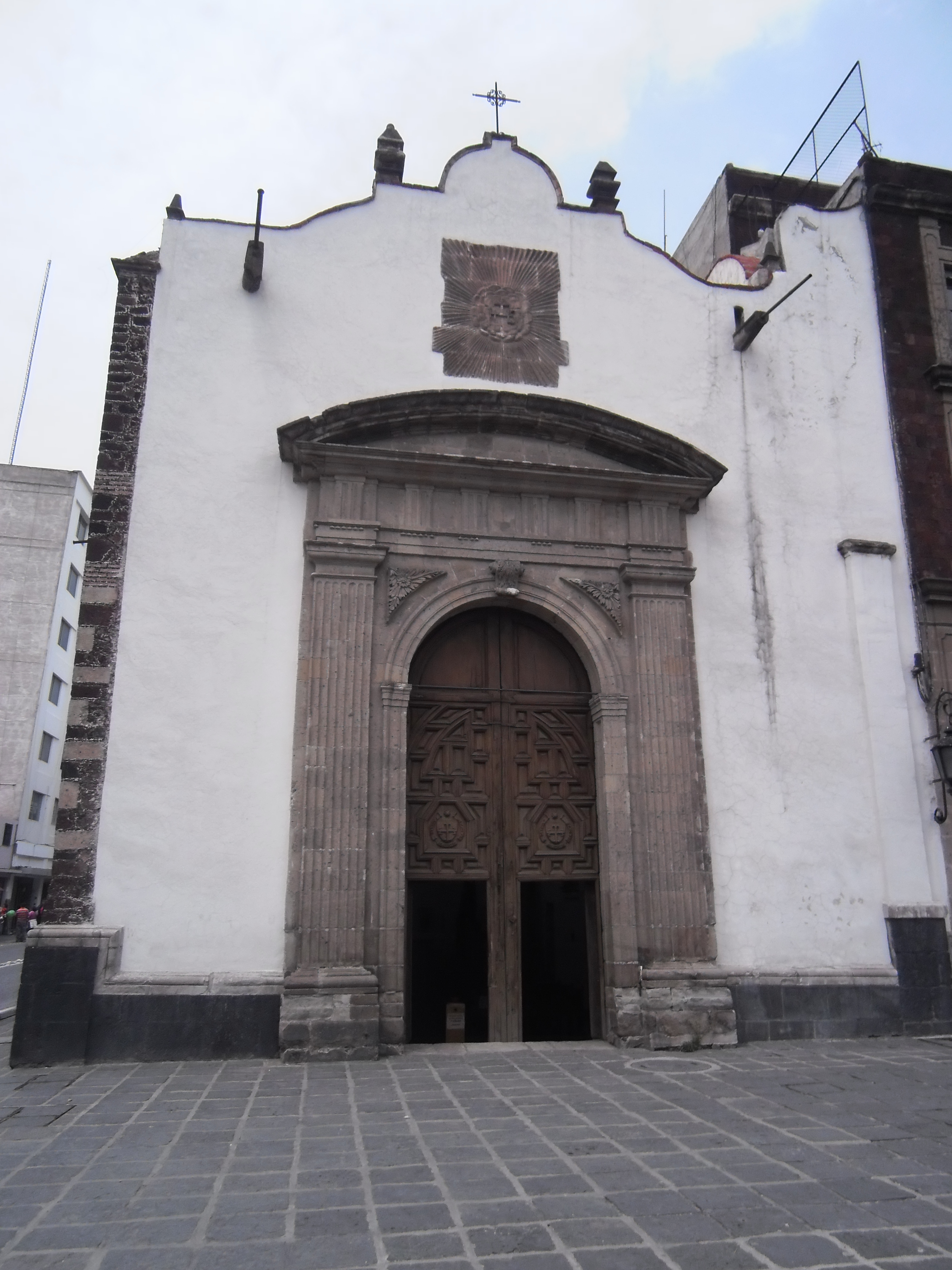
Capilla de la Expiración

The Guadalajara Cathedral has a predecessor built on the same site in 1541.

== México ==
The Catedral de Texcoco has antecedents beginning in 1526.

== Mexico City ==
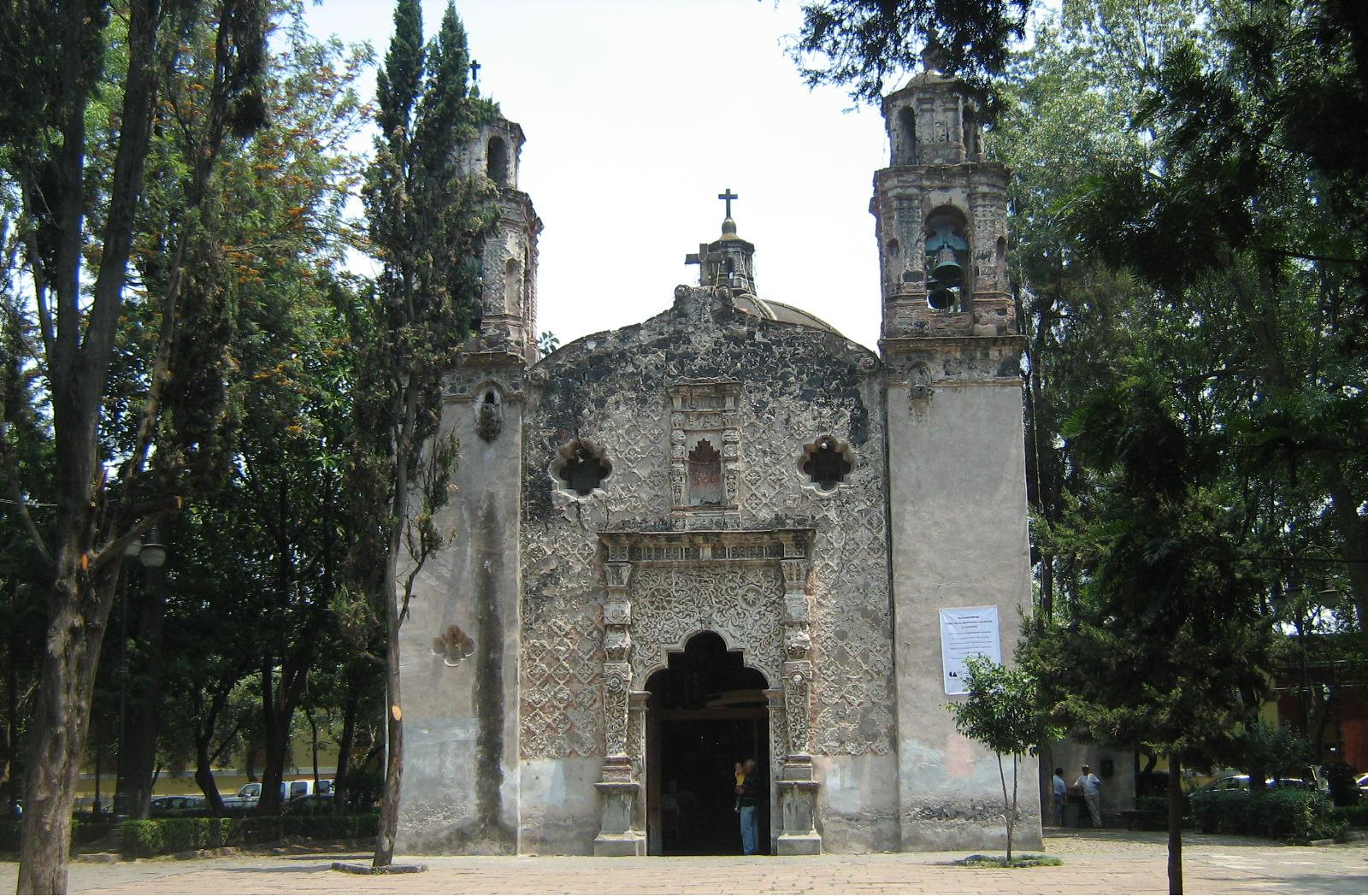
Iglesia de la Inmaculada Concepción

The Iglesia de la Inmaculada Concepción in Coyoacán began construction in 1525.

== Michoacán ==
The Capilla de Santa María Magdalena in Tacámbaro is from 1538.

== Morelos ==
Construction on the Cuernavaca Cathedral began in 1529. The building forms part of the World Heritage site Earliest 16th-Century Monasteries on the Slopes of Popocatépetl.

== Nayarit ==
The Templo de Santiago de Compostela has antecedents in the 16th century.

== Nuevo León ==
The Capilla de Doña Mónica Rodríguez in San Pedro Garza García dates to 1661.

== Oaxaca ==
The Templo y Exconvento de San Juan de Dios was completed in 1703. This is where the first mass in Oaxaca was held in 1521.

== Puebla ==
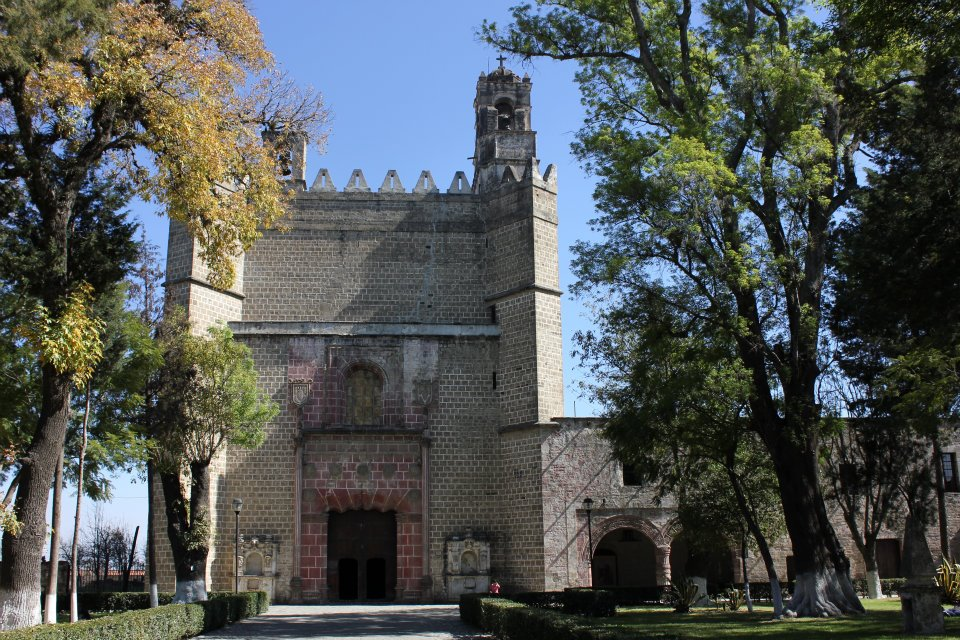
Convento de San Miguel Arcángel

The Convento de San Miguel Arcángel began construction in 1524 and is the oldest of the Monasteries on the slopes of Popocatépetl.

== Querétaro ==
The Iglesia Chiquita in El Marqués dates to 1529. It was founded following the conversion of Otomi leader Conín to Christianity.

== San Luis Potosí ==
The Exconvento de San Agustín in Xilitla is from 1557.

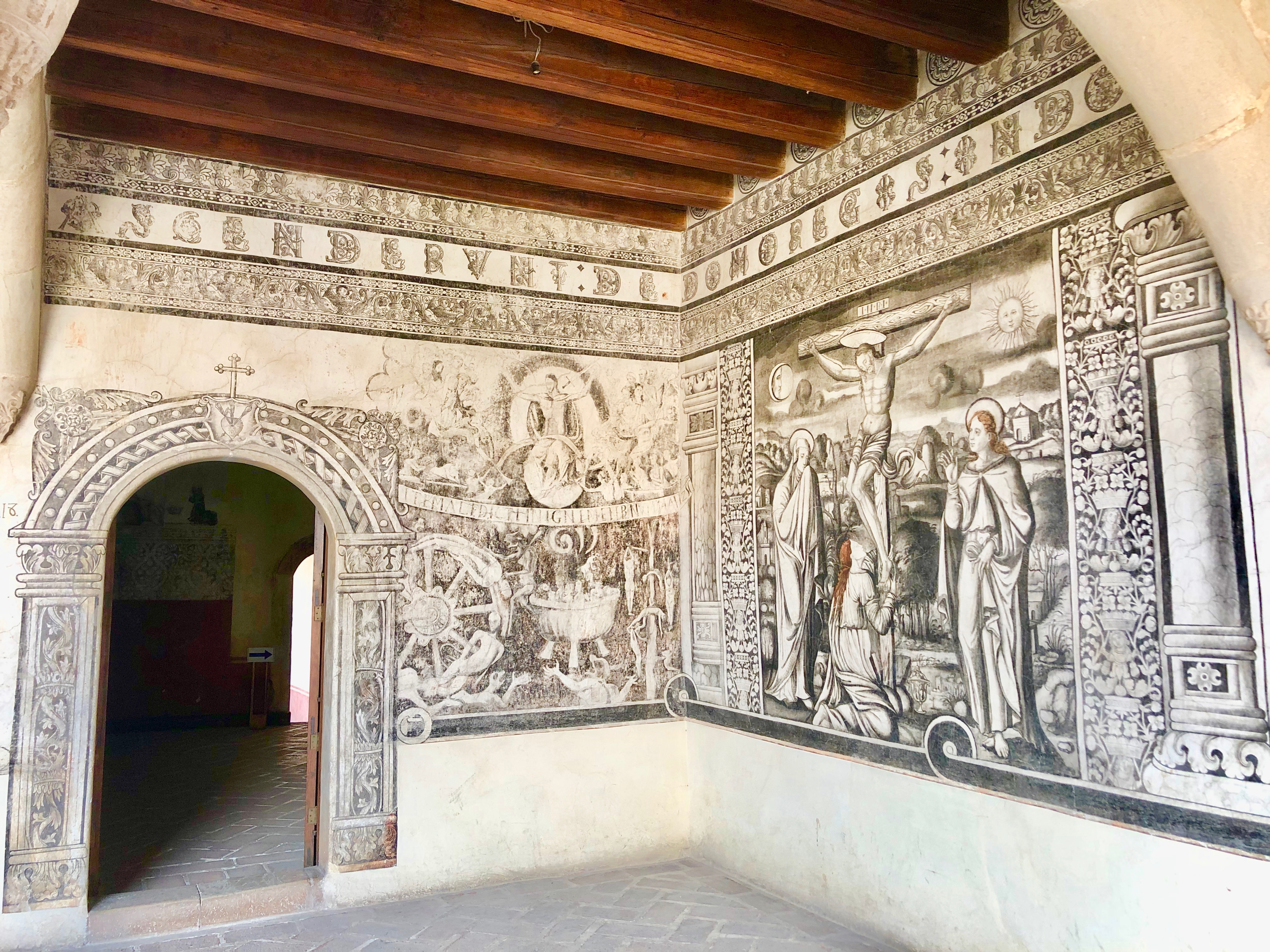
Exconvento de San Agustín

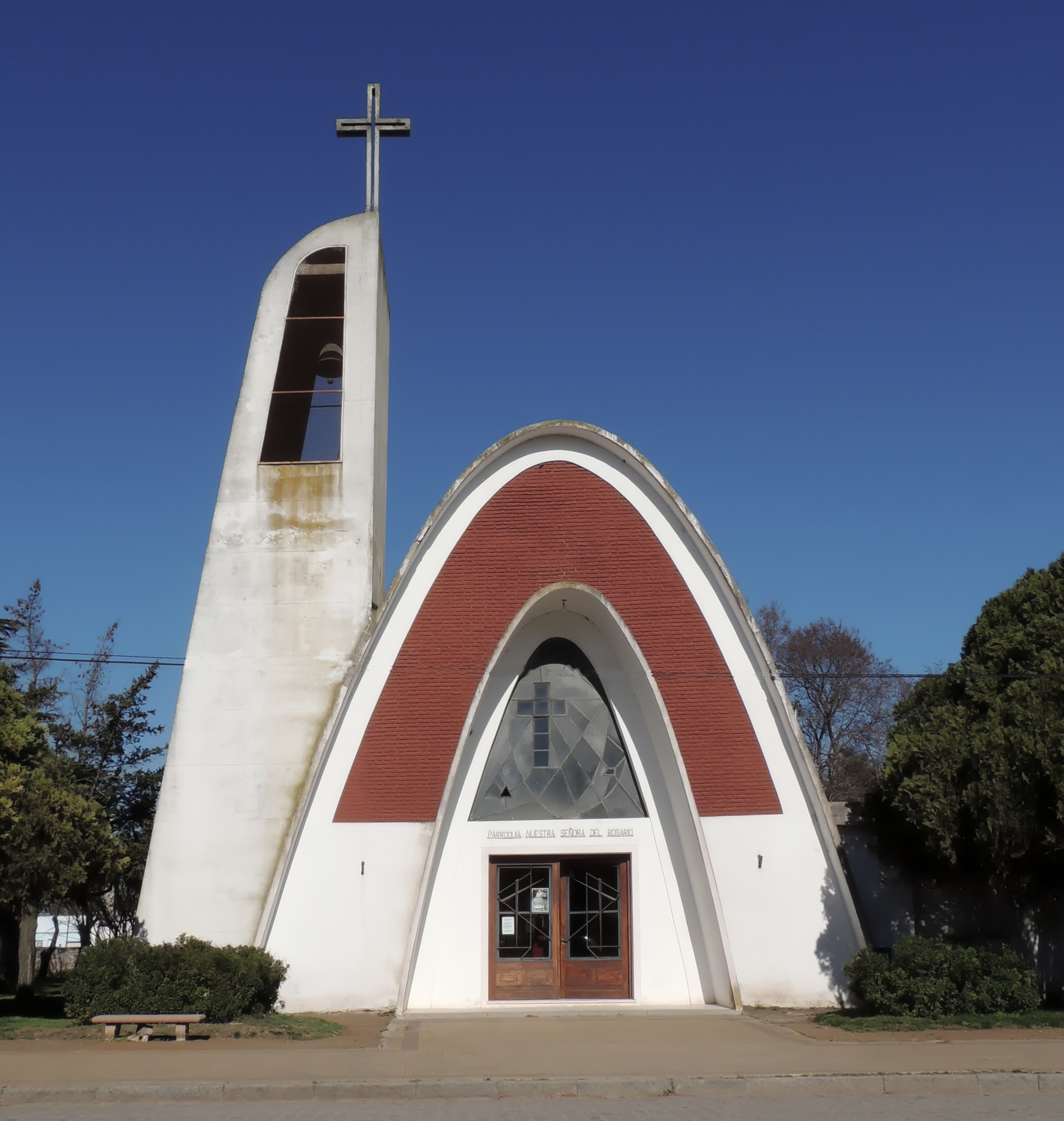
Parroquia de Nuestra Señora del Rosario

== Sinaloa ==
The Parroquia de Nuestra Señora del Rosario from 1731.

== Sonora ==
The Mission San Pedro y San Pablo del Tubutama founded in 1691 by Father Eusebio Francisco Kino.

The first mission was the Mission Nuestra Señora de los Dolores founded in 1687.

== Tabasco ==
The Iglesia de Nuestra Señora de la Asunción in Tacotalpa was completed in 1710.

== Tamaulipas ==
The Iglesia de Nuestra Señora de Las Nieves in Palmillas dates to 1777.

== Tlaxcala ==
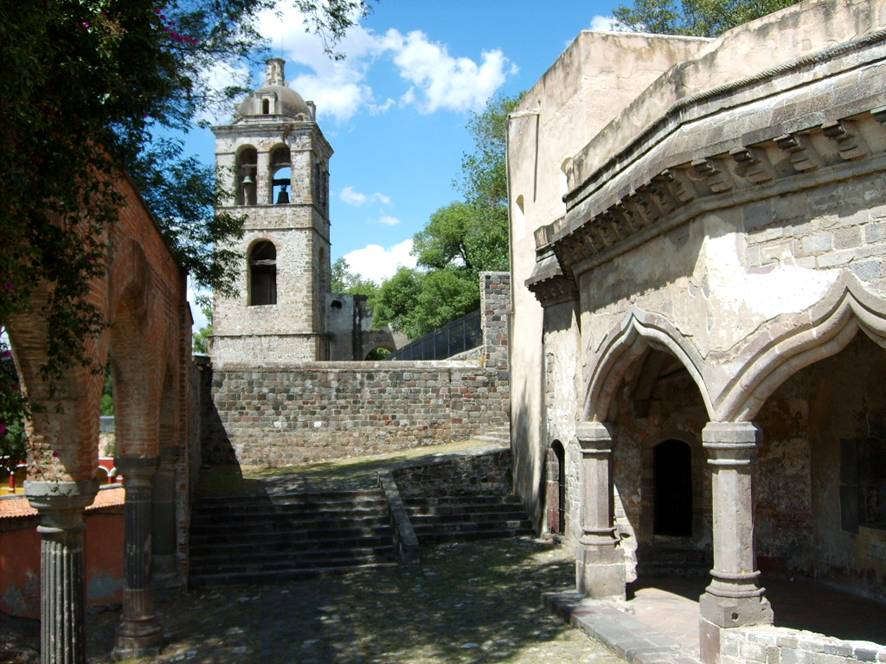
View of the bell tower and capilla abierta of the Catedral de Tlaxcala

Construction on what would become the Catedral de Tlaxcala occurred in the 1530s.

== Veracruz ==
The Parroquia de San José in Xalapa is from 1535.

== Yucatán ==
The Catedral de Yucatán was built between 1562 and 1599.

== Zacatecas ==
The Zacatecas Cathedral was preceded by two temples, one that began construction in 1568 and another in 1625.

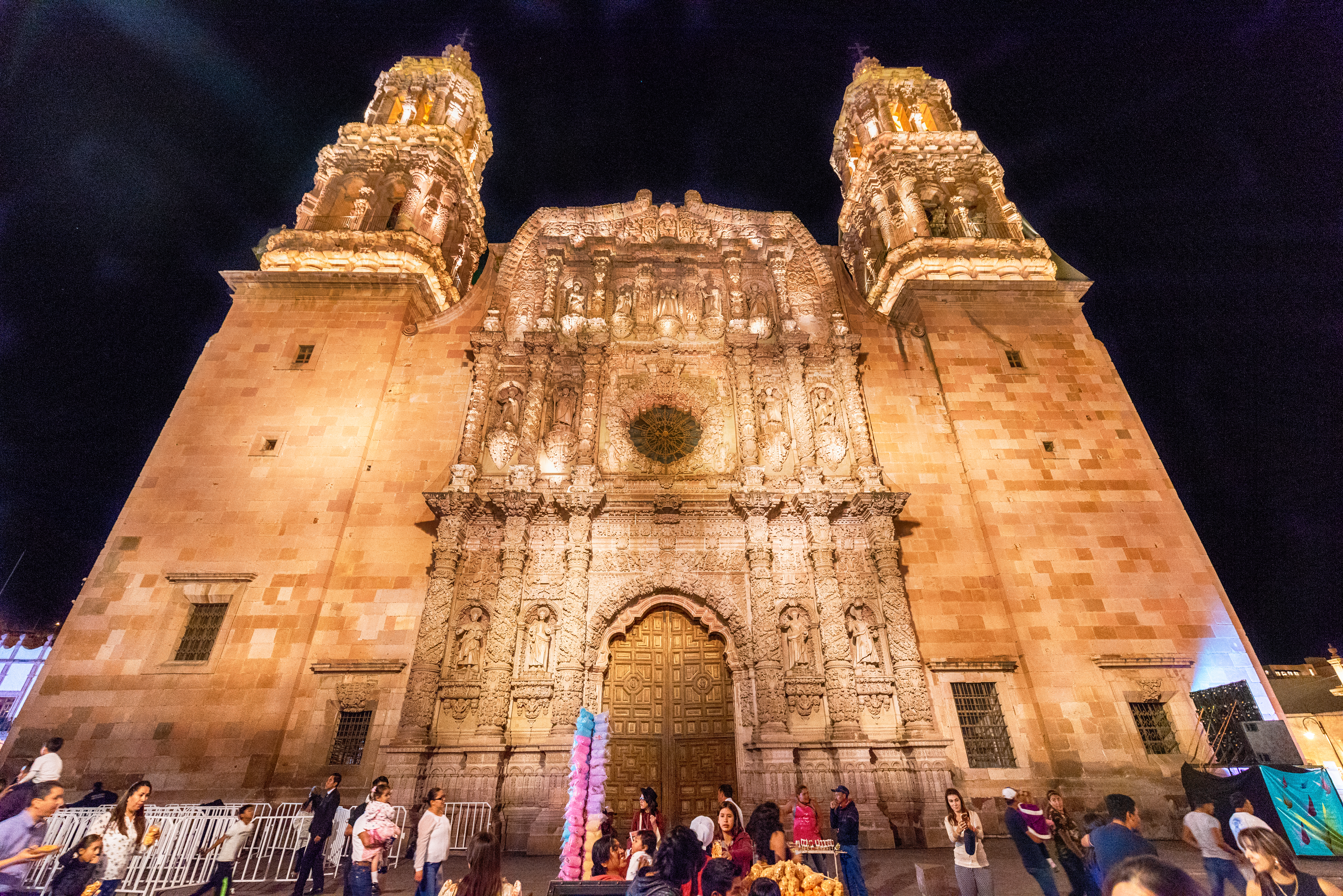
Zacatecas Cathedral

- List of the oldest churches in the United States
- Oldest churches in the world
- List of oldest buildings in the Americas
