= San Francisco Temple =

Catholic church in Chihuahua, Mexico

- Church of Saint Francis; Church of San Francisco
- El Templo de San Francisco
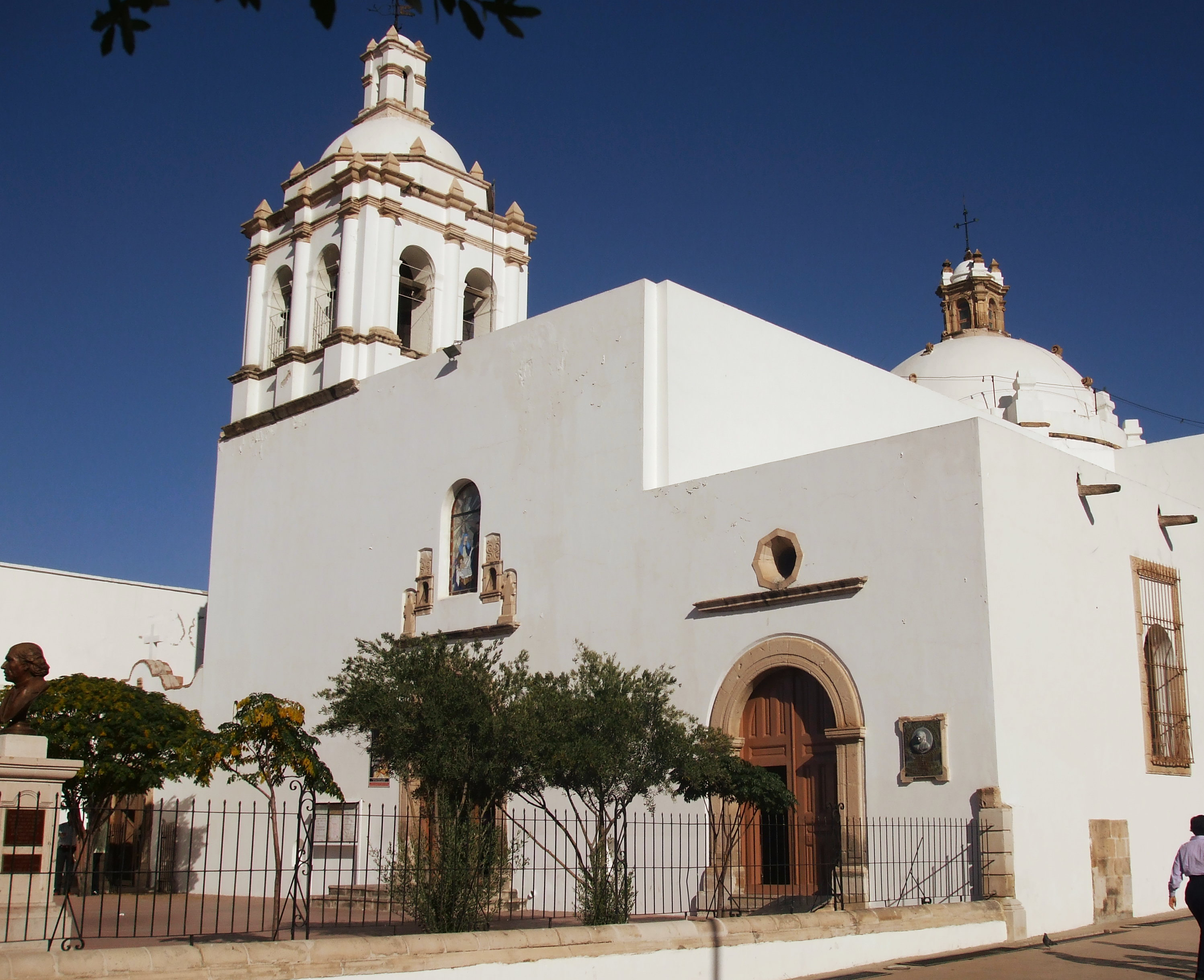
- San Francisco Temple
- 28°38′28″N 106°04′20″W
- Location: 15 Calle Libertad, Chihuahua
- Country: Mexico
- Denomination: Roman Catholic
- Churchmanship: Dominicans

History
- Status: Church
- Founder: Franciscans
- Dedication: Saint Francis of Assisi

Architecture
- Functional status: Active
- Architectural type: Church
- Style: Spanish Colonial
- Groundbreaking: 1717
- Completed: 1789; 237 years ago

The San Francisco Temple (Spanish: Templo de San Francisco), also known as the Church of Saint Francis and the Church of San Francisco, is a Roman Catholic church in the city of Chihuahua, in Chihuahua, Mexico. It is recognized as one of the most valuable buildings in the city as one of the few still-existing colonial monuments in the city centre. It is located at 15 Calle Libertad.

Even though it is named for St Francis of Assisi (because a previous name of the city of Chihuahua was San Francisco El Cuellar and because it was built and occupied first by the Franciscans), it is now maintained and supported by the Dominicans. Its architecture is typical of Franciscan missions, very simple and serene, and always painted in tones of white in accordance with the Franciscan policy of austerity.

== History ==
This building was one of the first churches built in Chihuahua City. Construction began in 1717 on a plan that called for a latin cross with a dome over the crossing (the sanctuary is essentially unchanged since completion in 1789); it also served as the first junior school for ladies in Chihuahua. In 1811 the beheaded body of Fr Miguel Hidalgo y Costilla, considered the 'Father of the Nation', was intombed in the West Chapel of the temple after his execution by the Spanish; after the independence of Mexico, it was taken to Mexico City. A marker commemorates the original burial site.

On September 16, 2004, the Church of San Francisco was first illuminated for the celebrations of the anniversary of the Independence of Mexico.

== Gallery ==
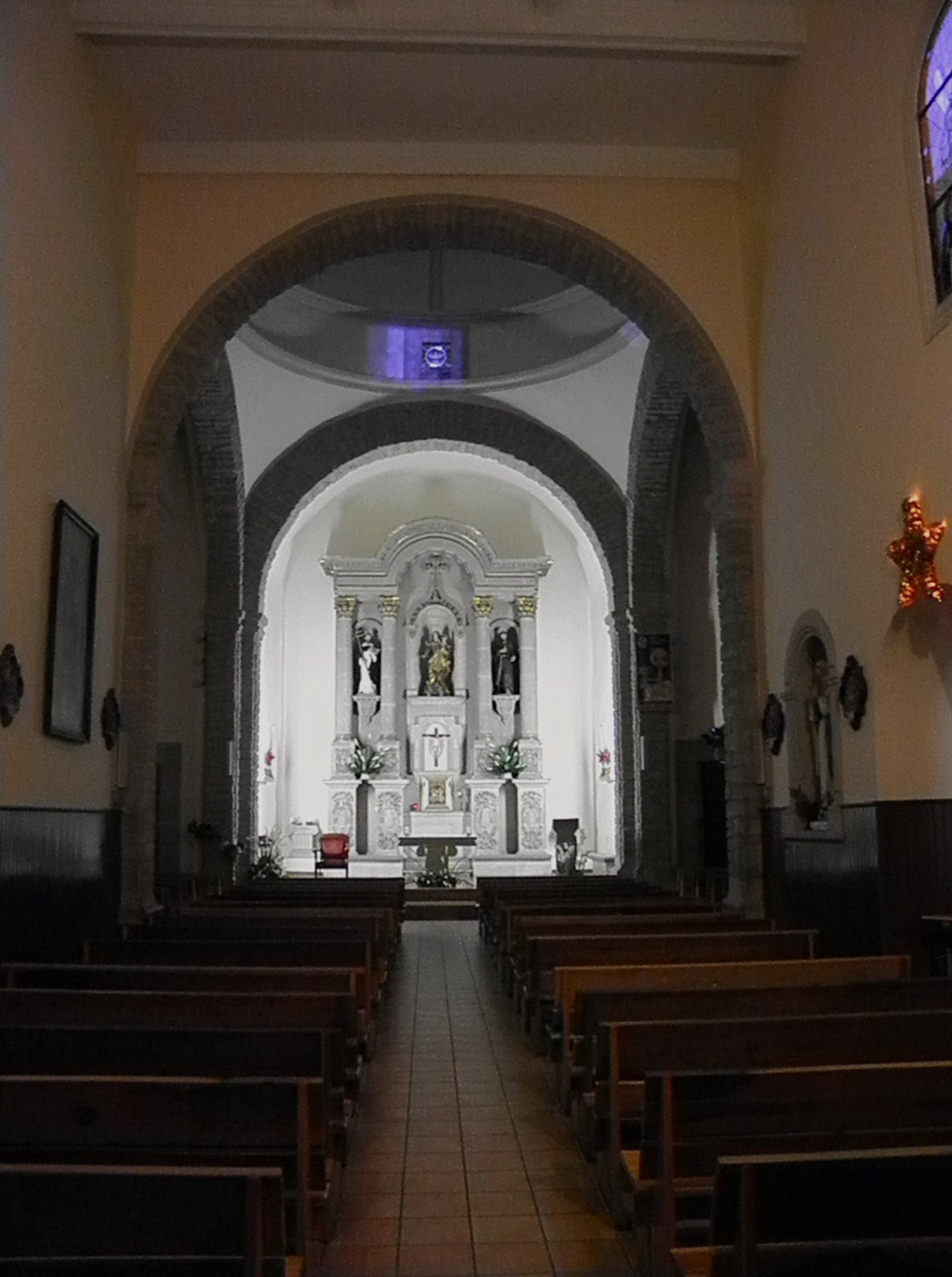
The nave

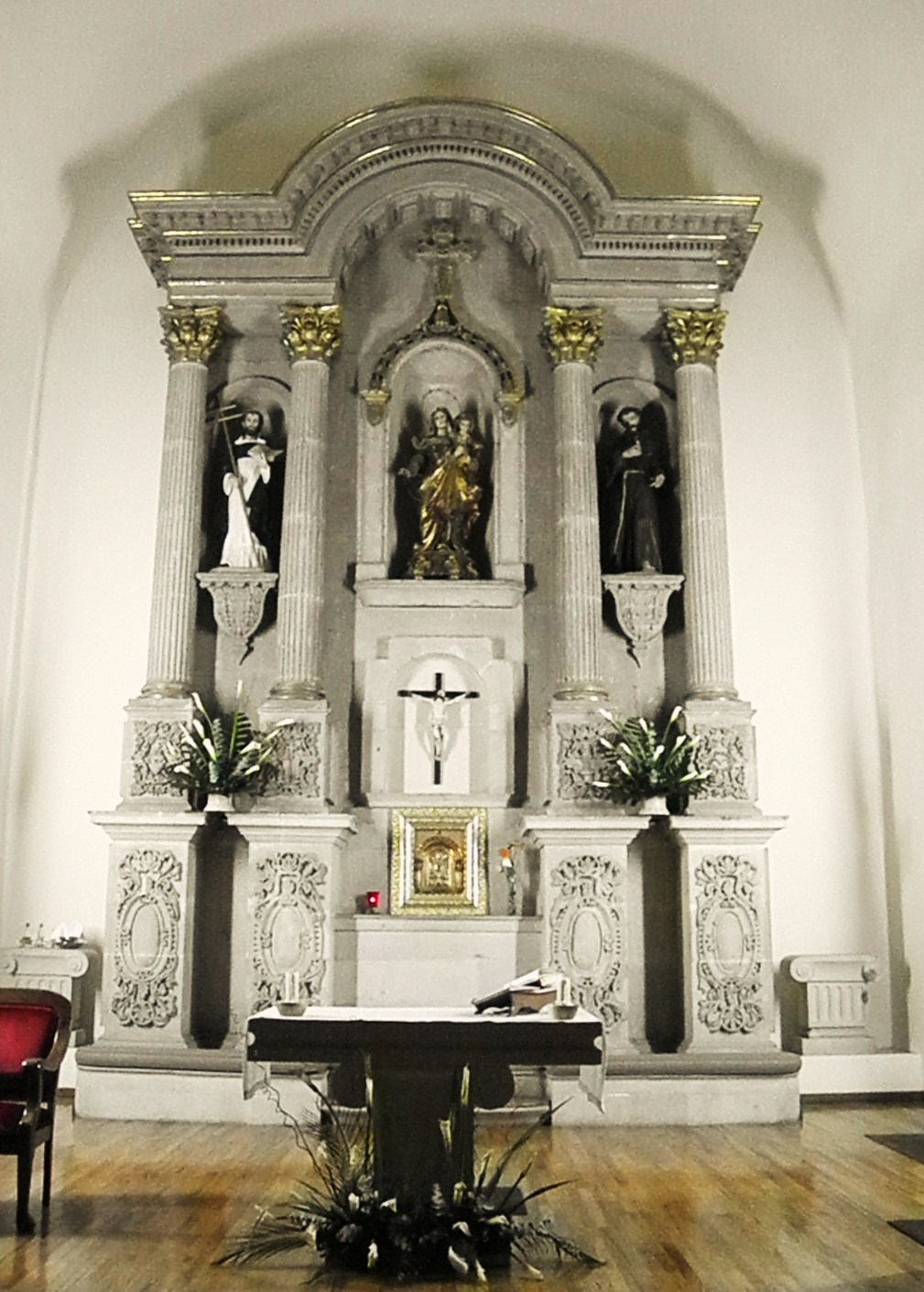
The high altar

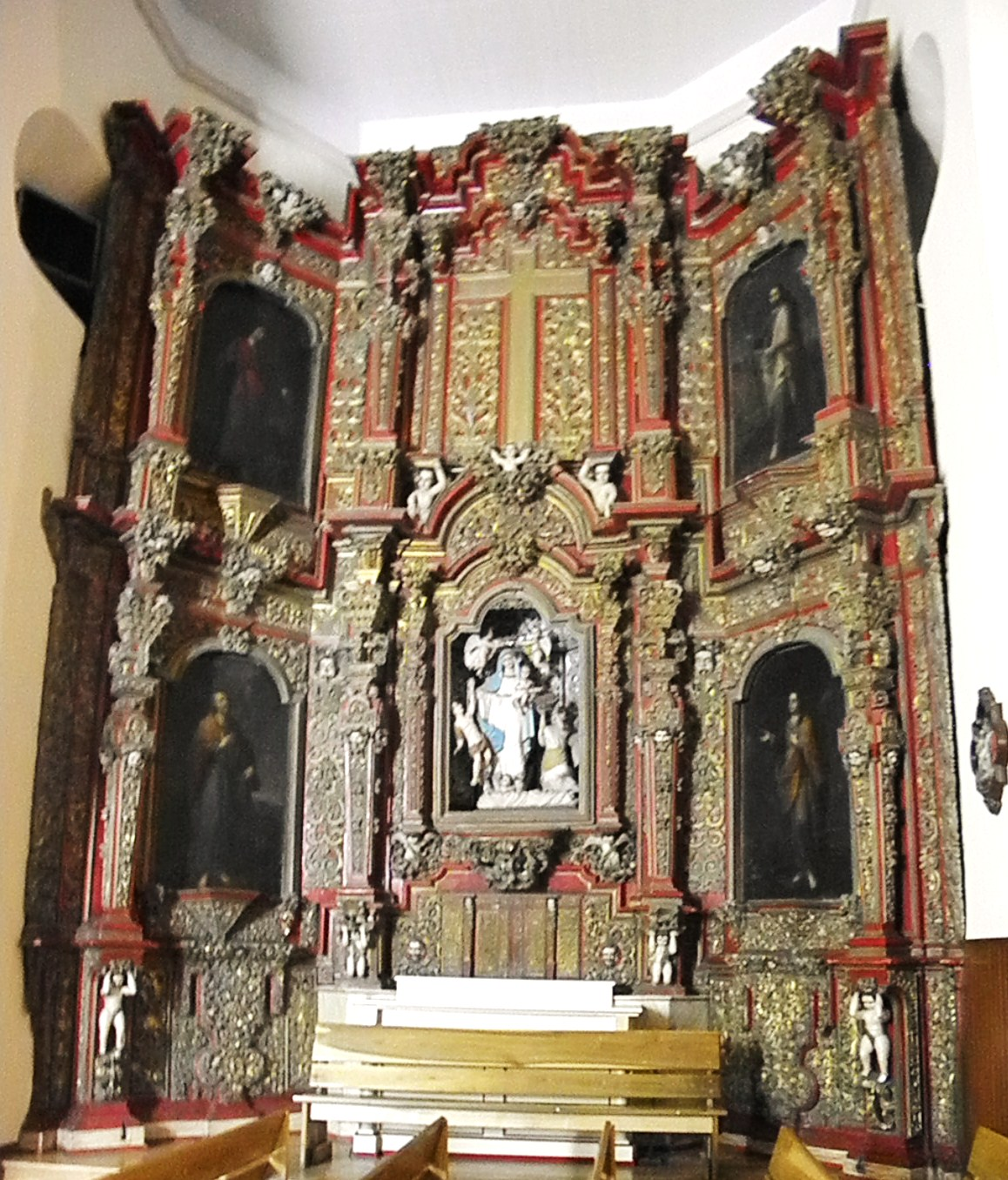
Churrigueresque west transept altar

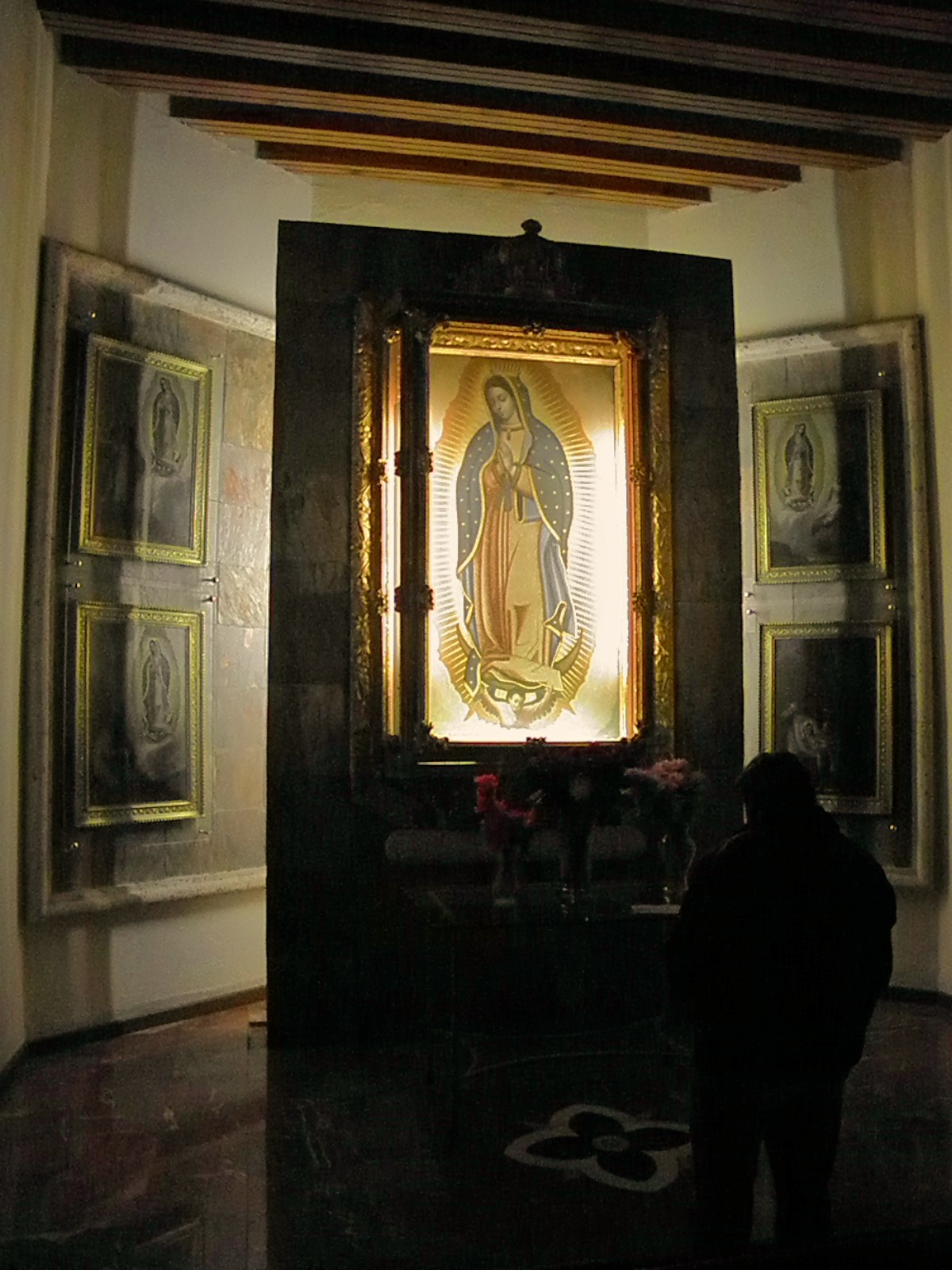
Chapel of Our Lady of Guadalupe

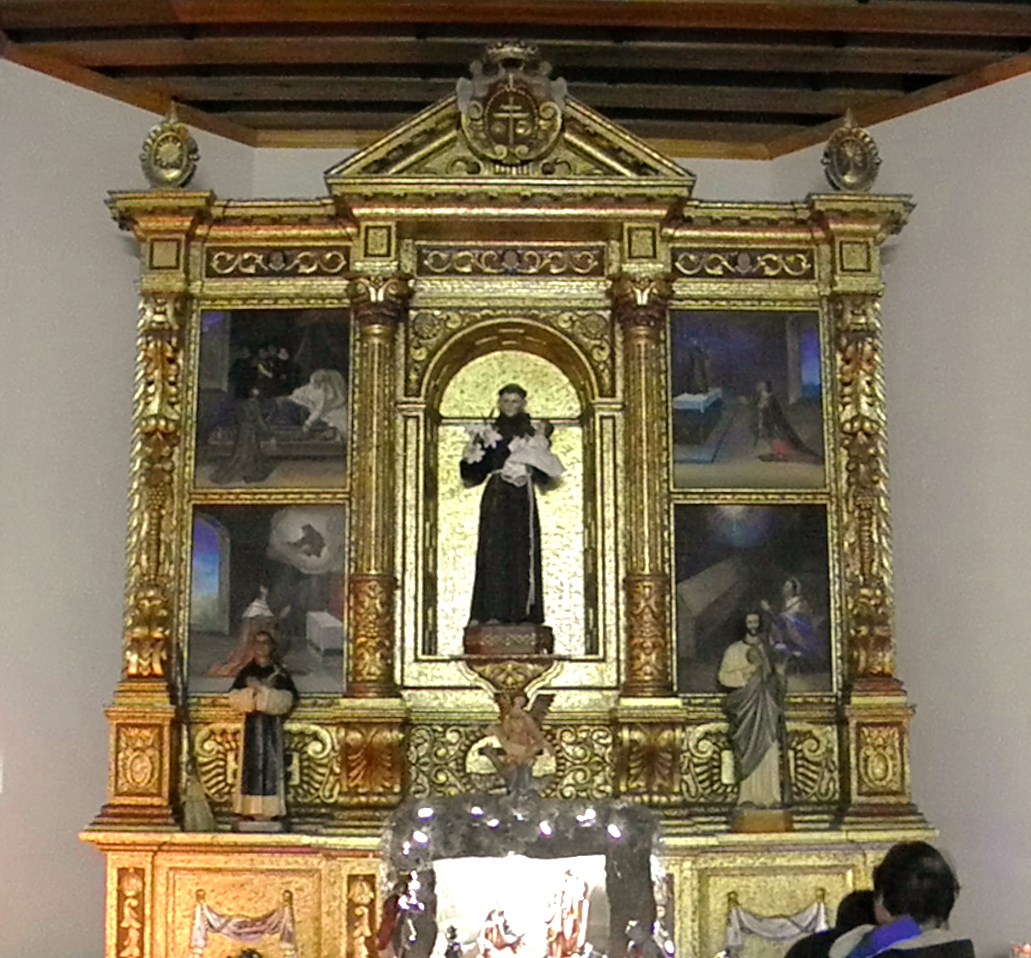
West chapel altarpiece

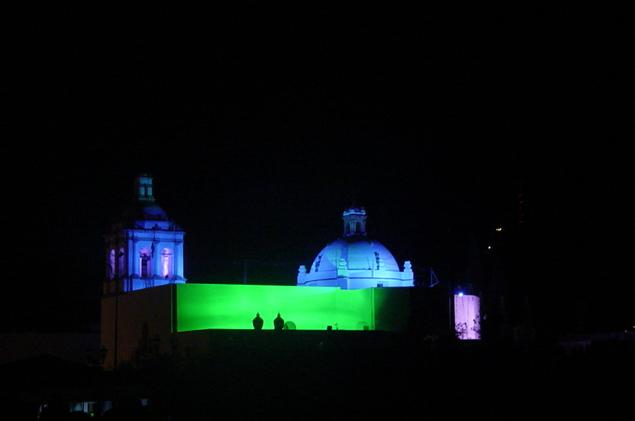
The church fully illuminated at night, 2004

== See also ==
- Spanish Colonial architecture
