= Kfar Saba =

Kfar Sava כְּפַר סָבָא
- City (from 1962)

Hebrew transcription(s)
  - ISO 259: Kfar Sava
  - Translit.: Kfar Sava
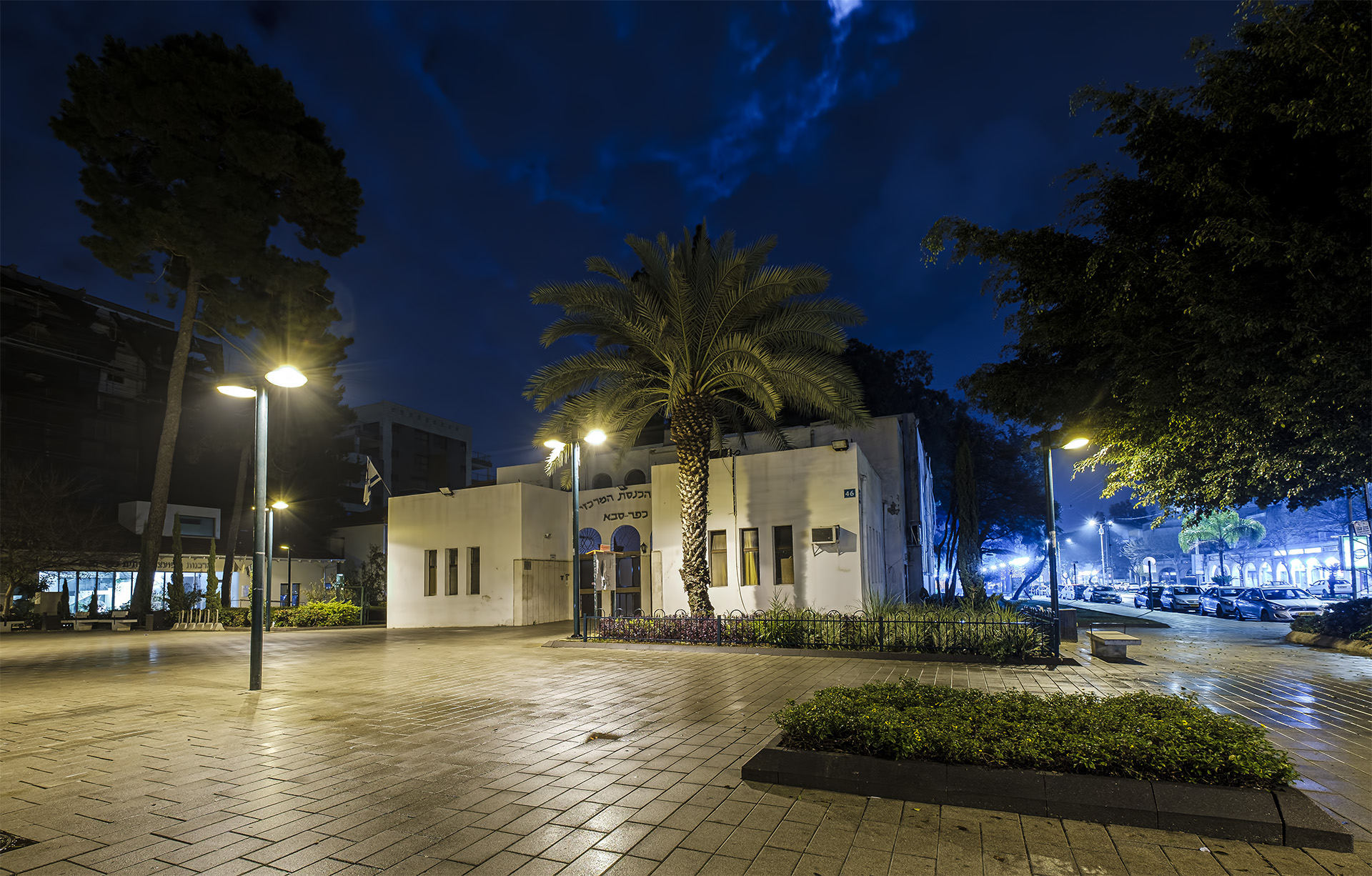
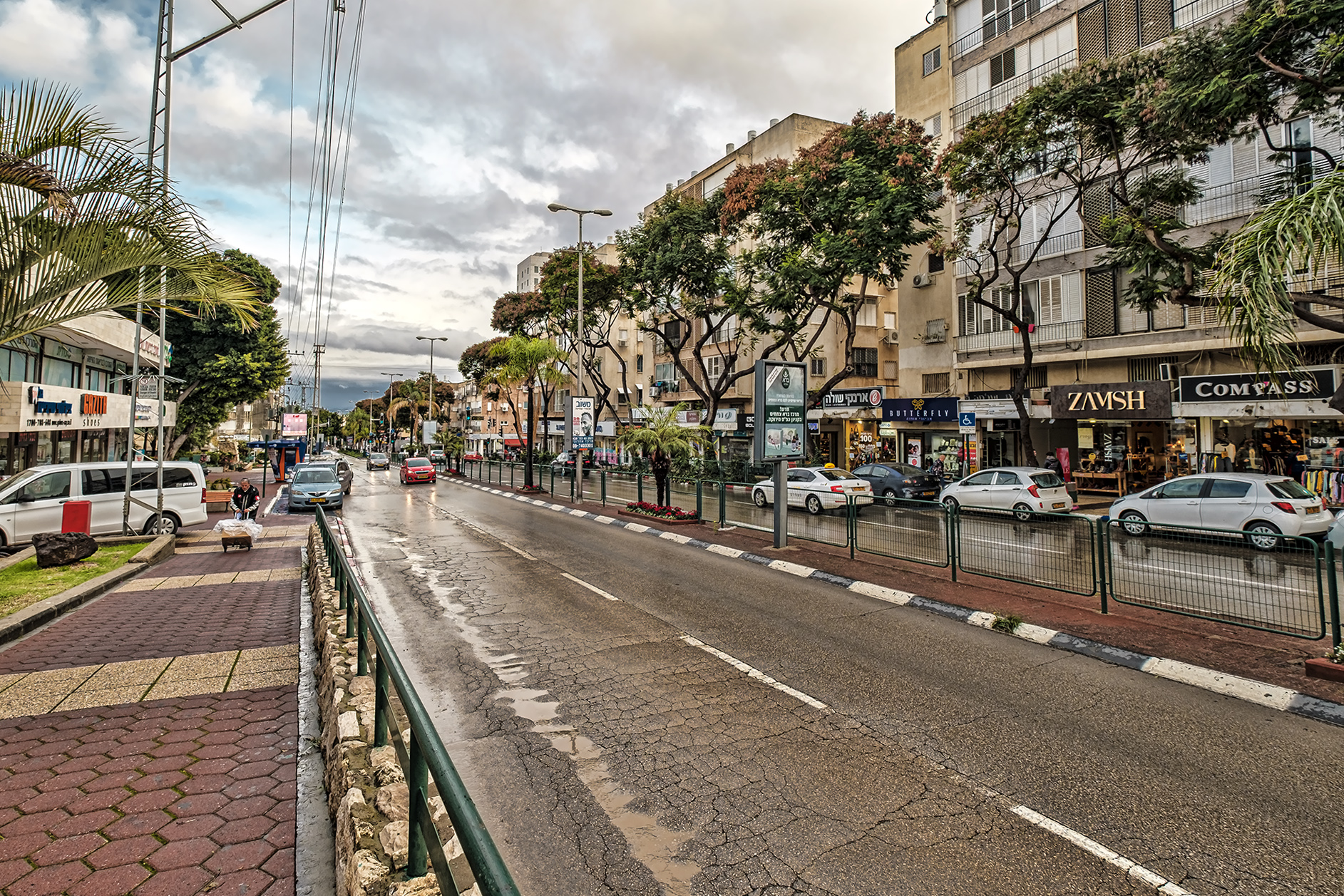
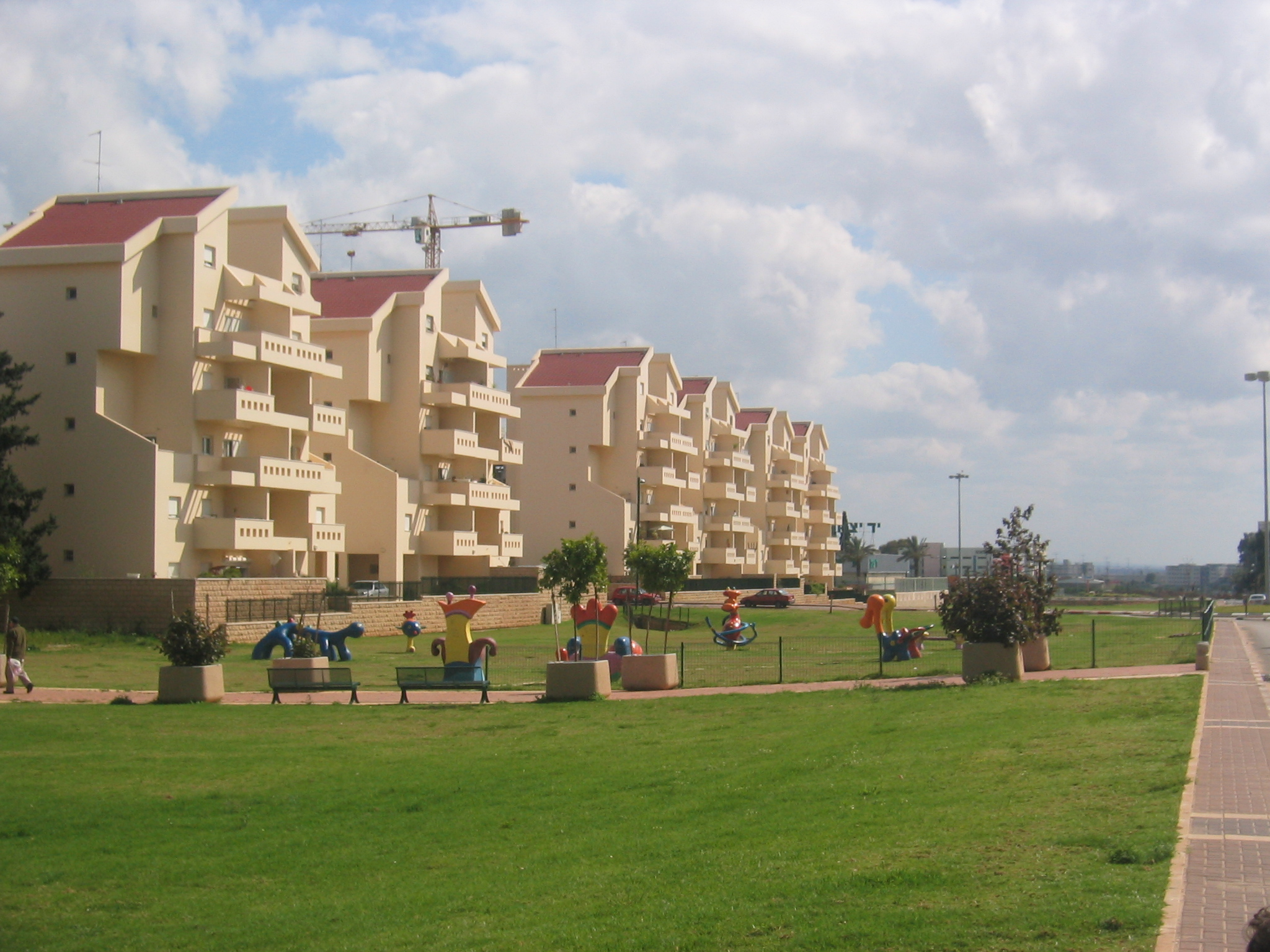
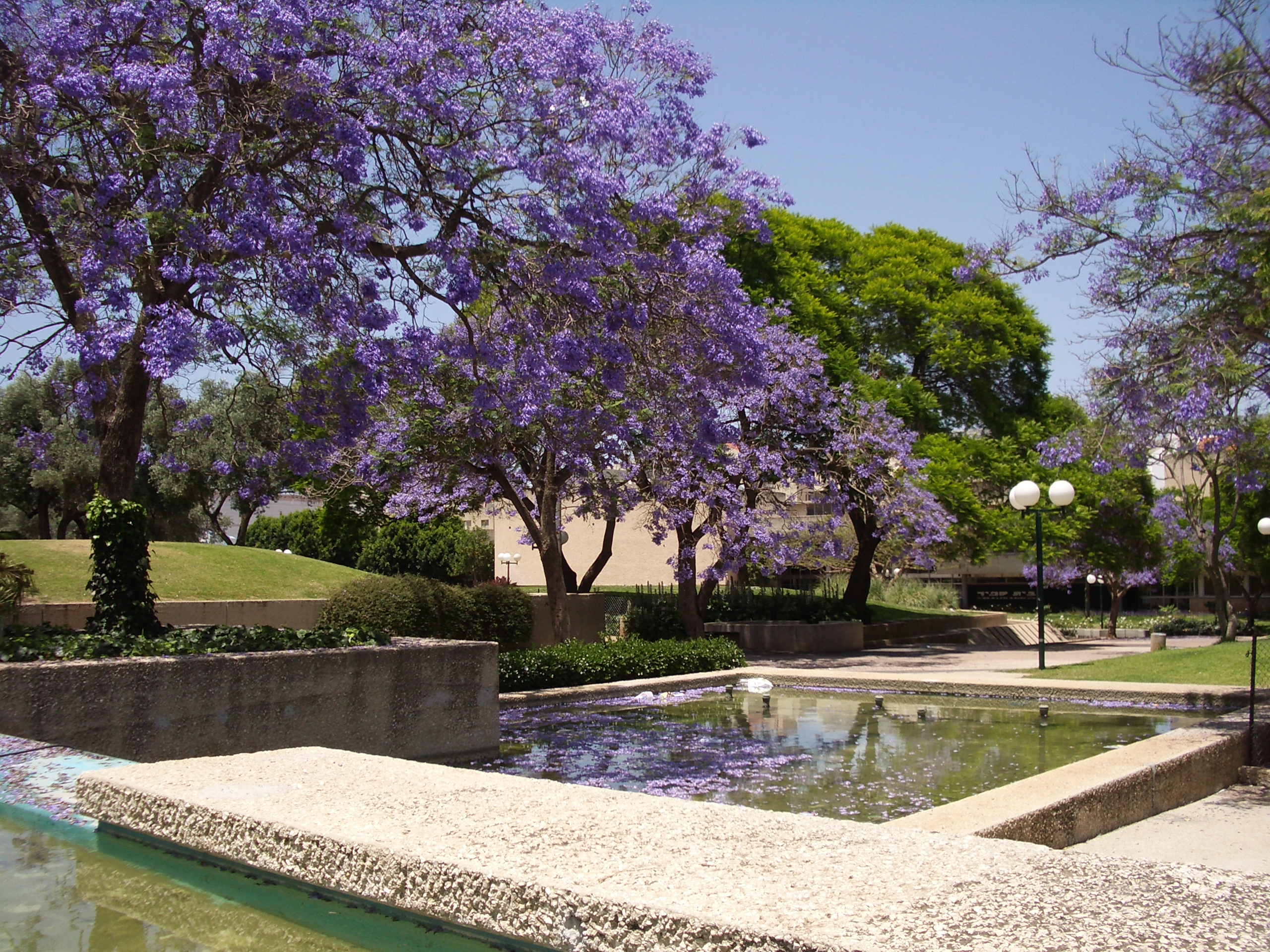
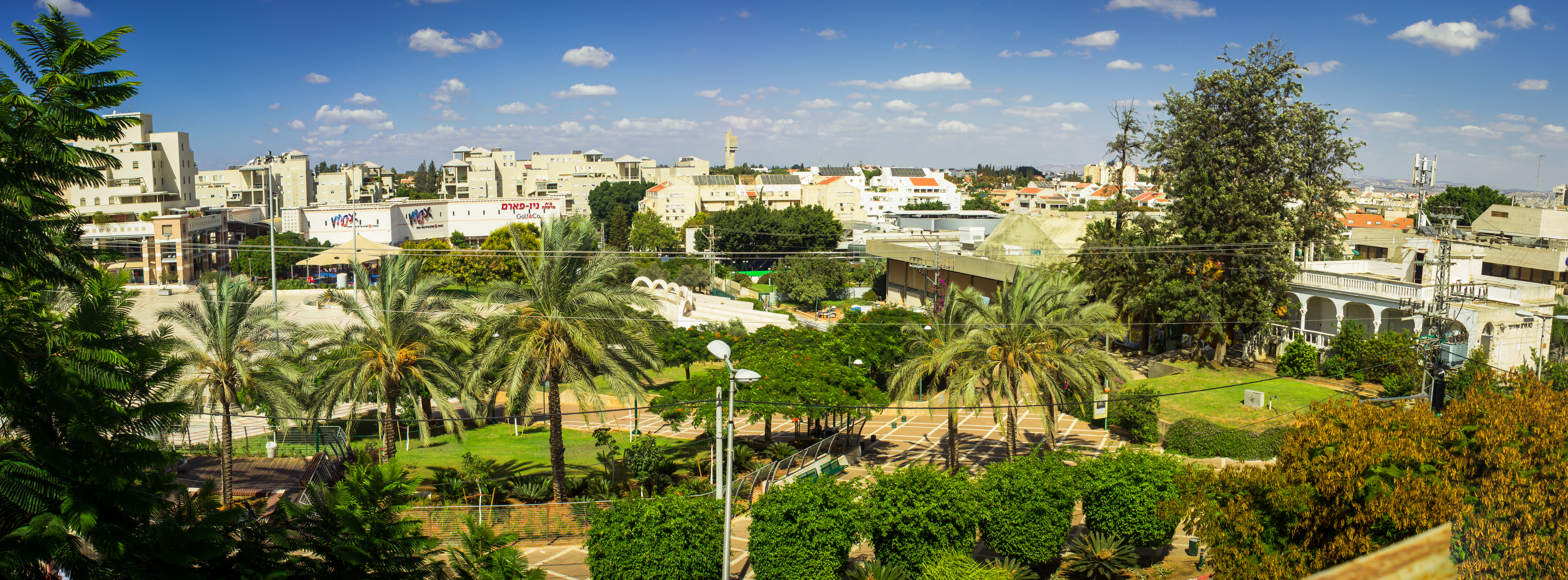

- Flag

- Location within Central Israel Location within Israel
- Coordinates: 32°10′17″N 34°54′30″E
- Country: Israel
- District: Central
- Subdistrict: Petah Tikva
- Natural Region: Southern Sharon
- Founded: 1903; 123 years ago

Government
  - Mayor: Rafi Saar

Area
  - Total: 14,169 dunams (14.169 km^{2}; 5.471 sq mi)

Population (2024)
  - Total: 99,410
  - Density: 7,016/km^{2} (18,170/sq mi)
- Website: www.kfar-saba.muni.il (in Hebrew)

Kfar Saba [kfaʁˈsaba] (Hebrew: כְּפַר סַבָּא, lit. 'Grandfather's Village'), officially Kfar Sava [kfaʁ saˈva], is a city in the Sharon region of the Central District of Israel. In 2024 it had a population of 99,410, making it the 16th-largest city in Israel. The population of Kfar Saba is nearly entirely Jewish. The Jewish moshav of Kfar Saba was established in 1898. During World War I, the town took in about a thousand Jewish refugees of the Tel Aviv and Jaffa deportation.

== History of modern Kfar Saba ==
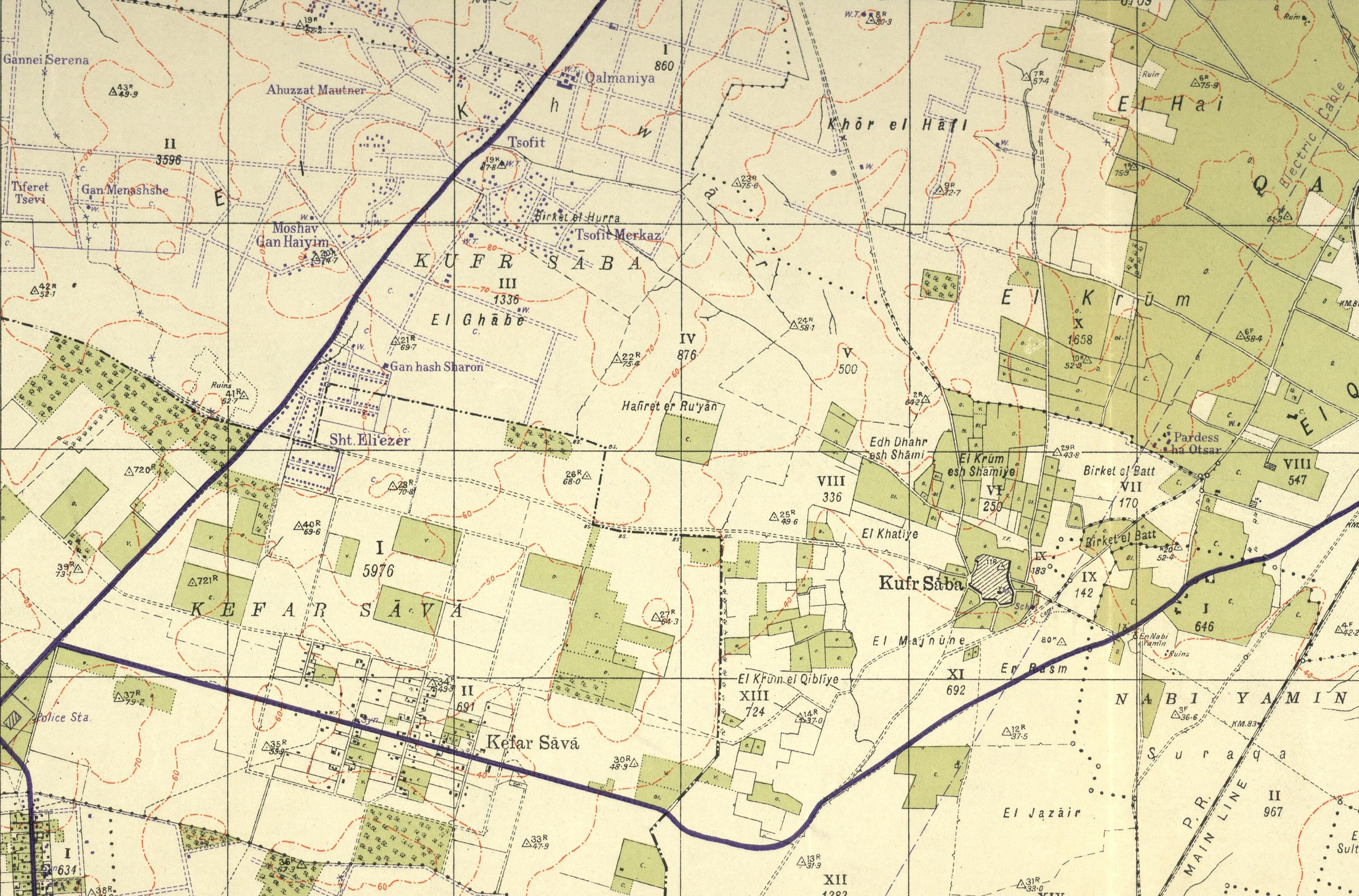
Kufr Saba and Kefar Sava in 1942 from the Survey of Palestine

The village of Kafr Saba was considered to be ancient Capharsaba, an important settlement during the Second Temple period in ancient Judea. It is mentioned for the first time in the writings of Josephus, in his account of the attempt of Alexander Jannaeus to halt an invasion from the north led by Antiochus, appears in the Talmud in connection to corn tithing and the Capharsaba sycamore fig tree.

=== Beginnings (1898–1913) ===
The Jewish moshav of Kfar Saba was established in 1898, following the purchase of land from the Arab village of the same name. Acquiring 7,500 dunams (equivalent to 1,668 acres in Ottoman Palestine, where a dunam equals 911.3 square meters), the endeavor faced initial challenges: the land was desolate, neglected, and distant from other Jewish settlements. Furthermore, the Ottoman pasha of Nablus, to whose governorate the land belonged, refused to give building permits, forcing the first settlers to live in huts made of clay and straw. They earned their living by growing almonds, grapes and olives. It was located approximately 3 km to the west of the Arab village of Kafr Saba. Despite attractive advertisements in Jerusalem and London, initial attempts to sell plots to private individuals were unsuccessful. Starting in 1903, Jewish workers resided on the site of Kfar Saba. A well was dug in 1906. Most of the manual laborers on the land were peasants from Qalqilya. The first colonists reused ancient building stones from the nearby ancient ruins of Sabye.

In 1910, an Arab guard employed by Jewish landowners shot at a group of Arab almond thieves from Qalqilya, killing one. An Arab mob then descended on Kfar Saba, beating residents, breaking and looting equipment, and taking two Jewish guards prisoner. The situation was defused when reinforcements from Petah Tikva arrived, and a peace was negotiated. This attack drew widespread public attention among Jews in Palestine and around the world, and it was subsequently decided to turn Kfar Saba into a permanent settlement, even without building permits. In 1912, the construction of twelve single-story permanent houses began along a route that is now Herzl Street. The houses were camouflaged due to the lack of building permits. Construction was finished in 1913.

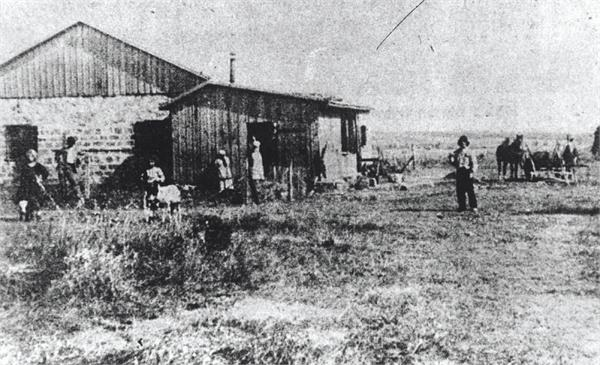
Kfar Saba 1913

=== World War I ===
When World War I broke out in 1914, the Ottoman authorities harassed the residents, confiscating work animals and crops. The 1915 Palestine locust infestation destroyed vegetation in the area. Before Kfar Saba had fully recovered, about a thousand Jewish refugees of the Tel Aviv and Jaffa deportation who were seeking shelter arrived. The town's few houses could not accommodate the large number of refugees, and many died due to the harsh sanitary conditions.

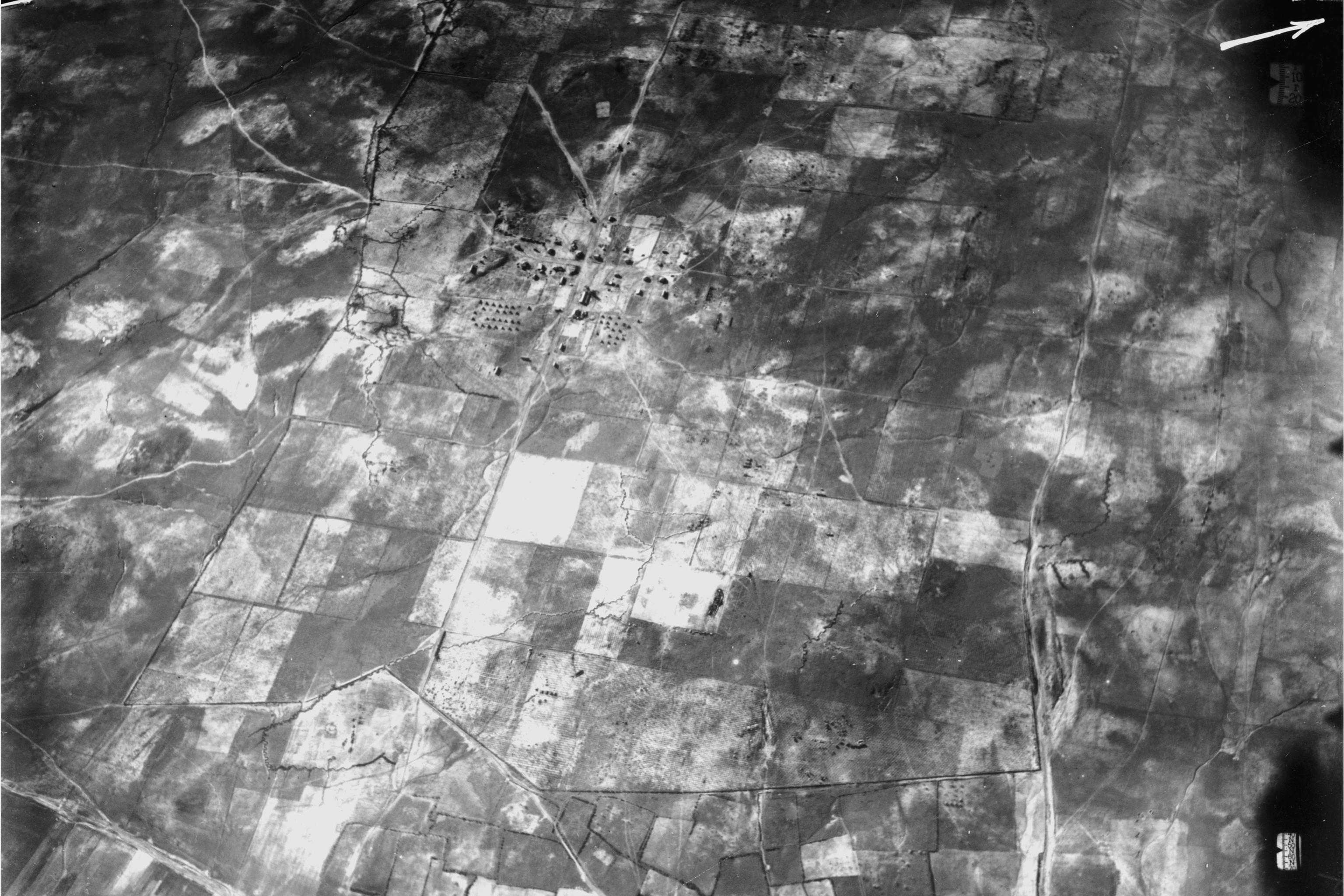
Aerial photograph of Kfar Saba taken by the German Air Force during World War I

In the Palestine Campaign of the war, Kfar Saba was on the front line between British General Edmund Allenby's Egypt Expeditionary Force and the Ottoman Army for almost a year, and by the time of the British victory in September 1918, it had been destroyed.

=== British Mandate ===
Following Kfar Saba's destruction in World War I, residents began rebuilding the town. During the 1921 Jaffa riots, Kfar Saba, then a small and isolated town, was evacuated on orders of the Haganah. It was attacked during the riots. In May 1921 the original residents returned and found their homes had been looted and burned. They began to rebuild the town for a third time, and it slowly recovered. In 1924 additional settlers joined Kfar Saba. In this period the moshava began to redevelop as cultivation of citrus fruit began, replacing almonds. The first elections for the local council were held.

In August 1947, a Jewish man was found shot to death outside the town.

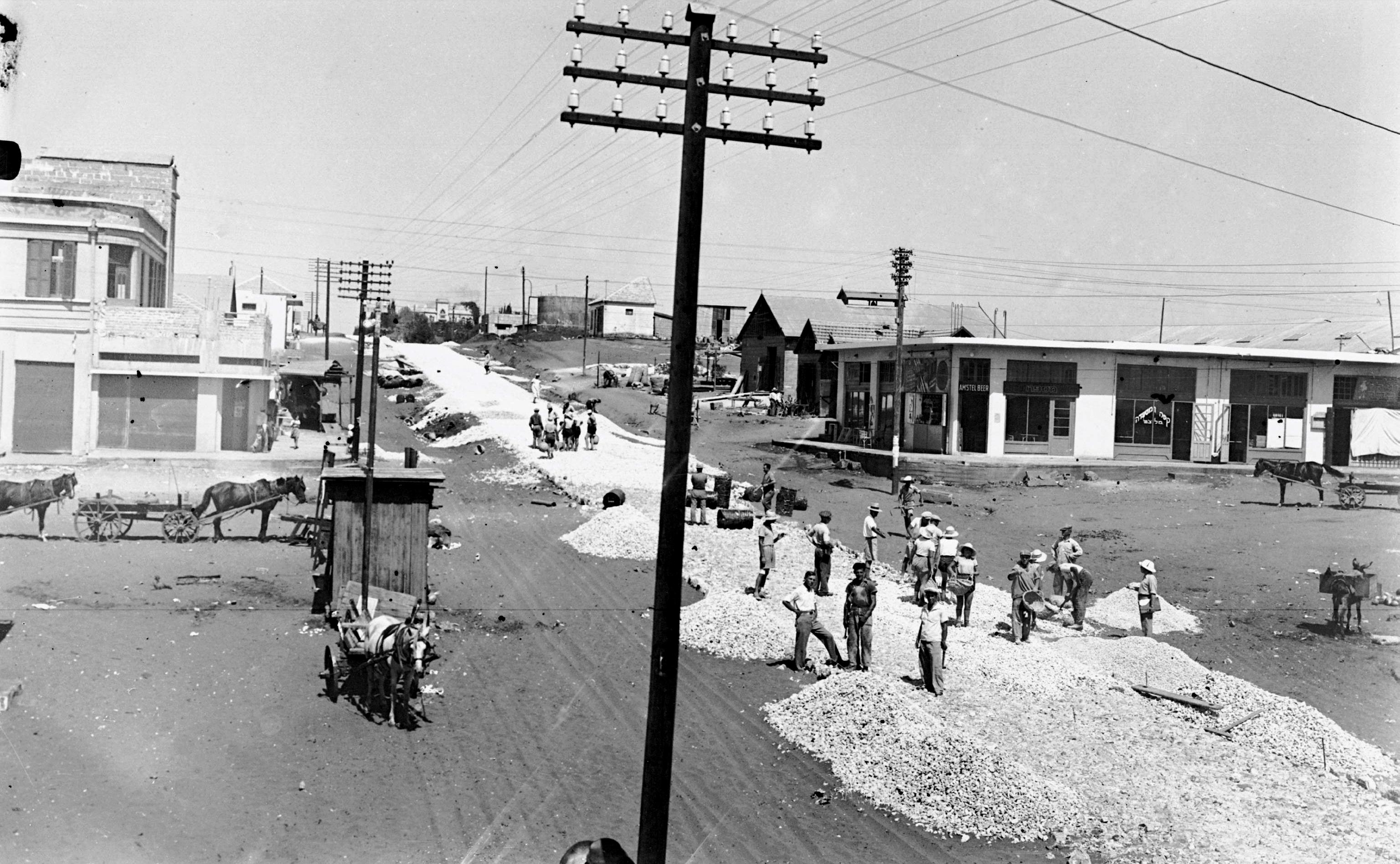
Paving a street in Kfar Saba, 1929

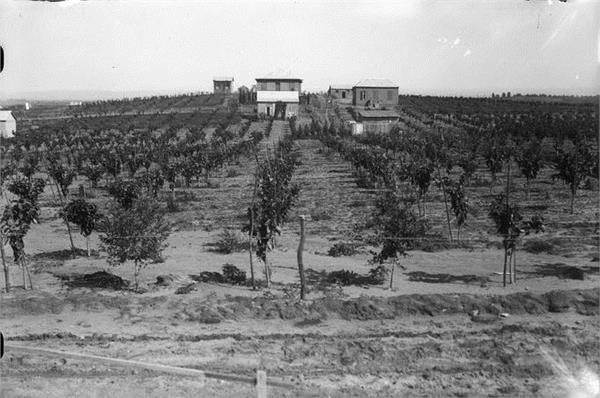
Kfar Saba 1930

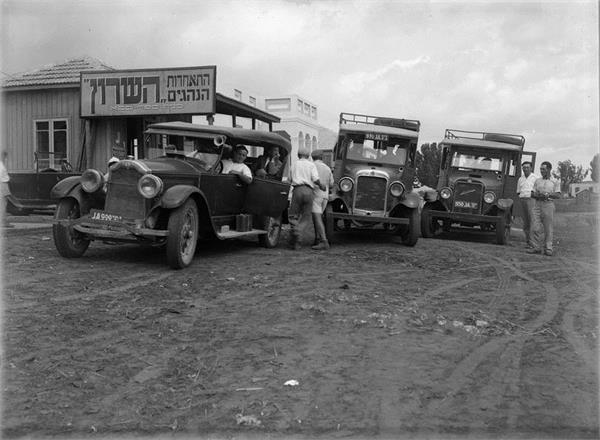
Kfar Saba 1934

Kfar Saba police 1933

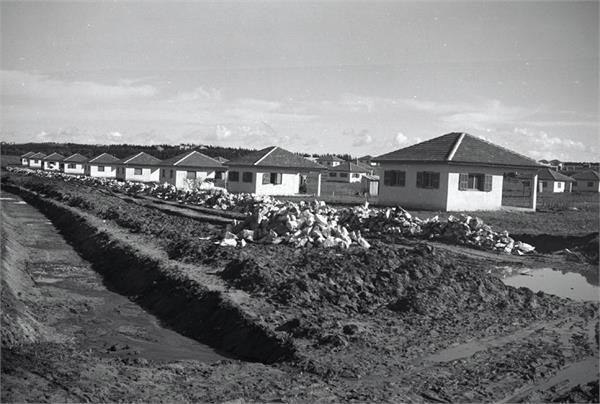
Kfar Saba 1938

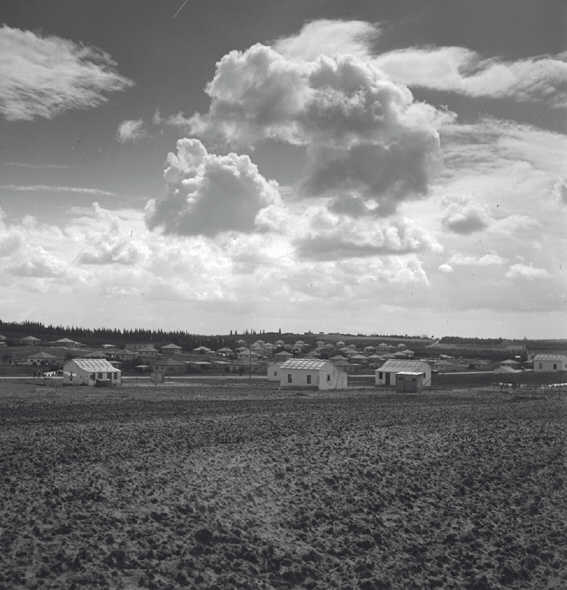
Kfar Saba immigrant housing 1945

=== 1947–48 war ===
In December 1947, as the civil war between the Arab and Jewish communities got underway, leaders of both sides in the area pledged to keep the peace between the local communities. In the following months, Kfar Saba was attacked by local Arab militia from the nearby Arab village of Kafr Saba. The Arab Liberation Army (ALA), an outfit consisting of volunteers from several neighboring Arab countries, sent troops to aid in these attacks.

The village was depopulated of its Arab residents by Jewish militia on May 13, 1948, one day before the new State of Israel was declared.

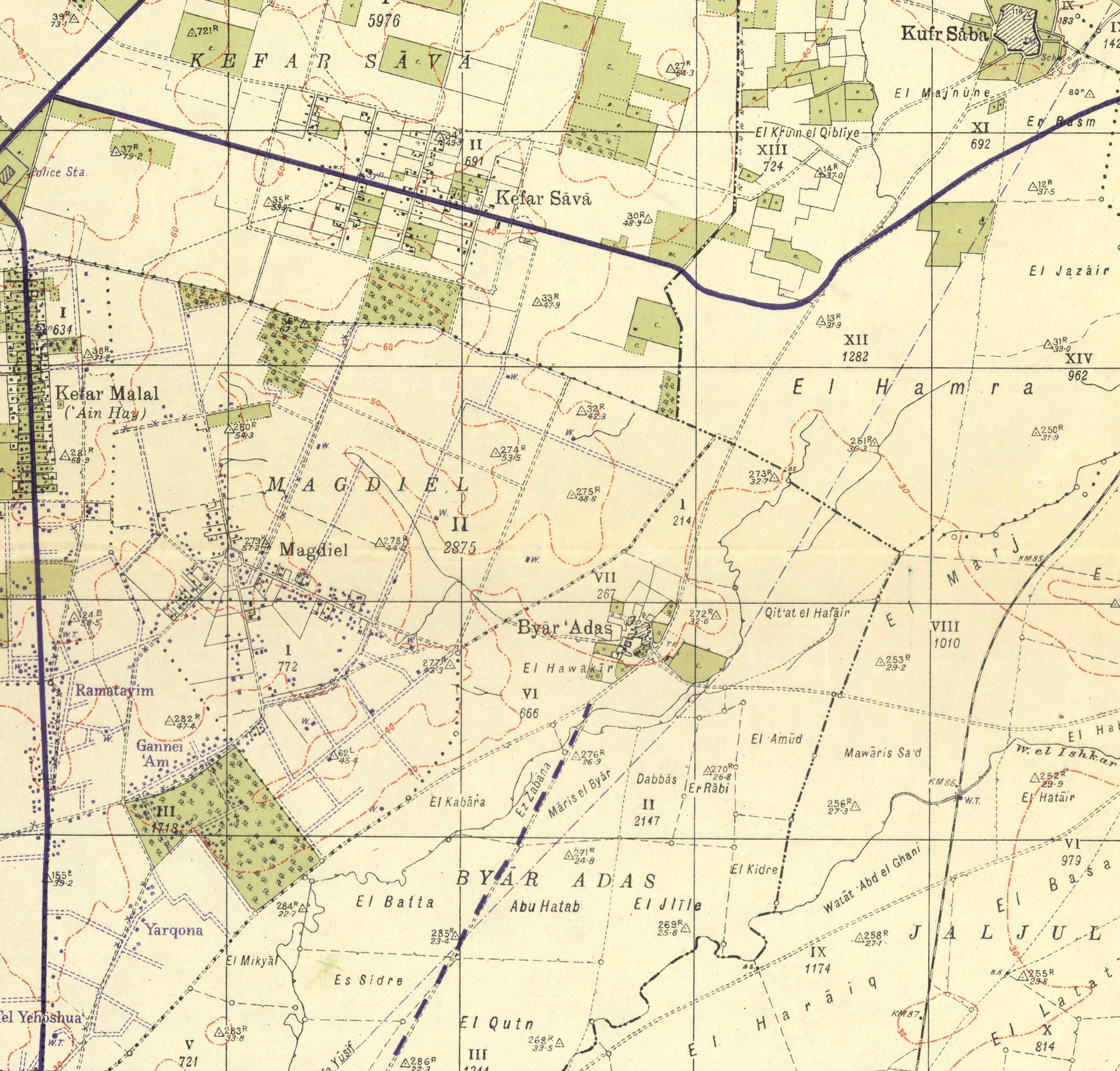
Kfar Saba 1942 1:20,000

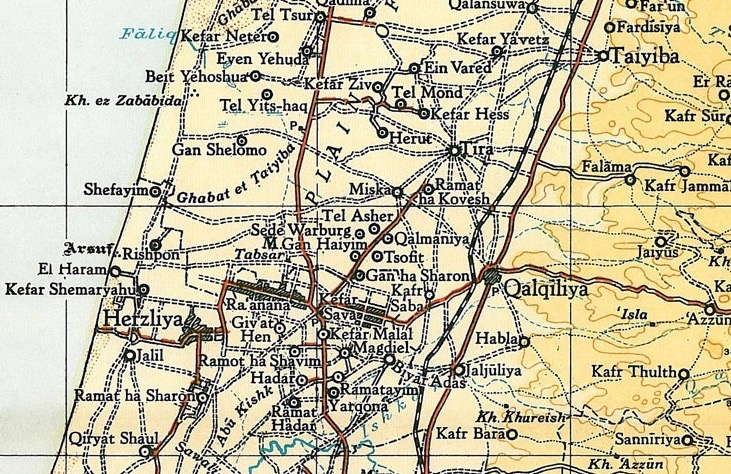
Kfar Saba 1945 1:250,000

=== State of Israel ===
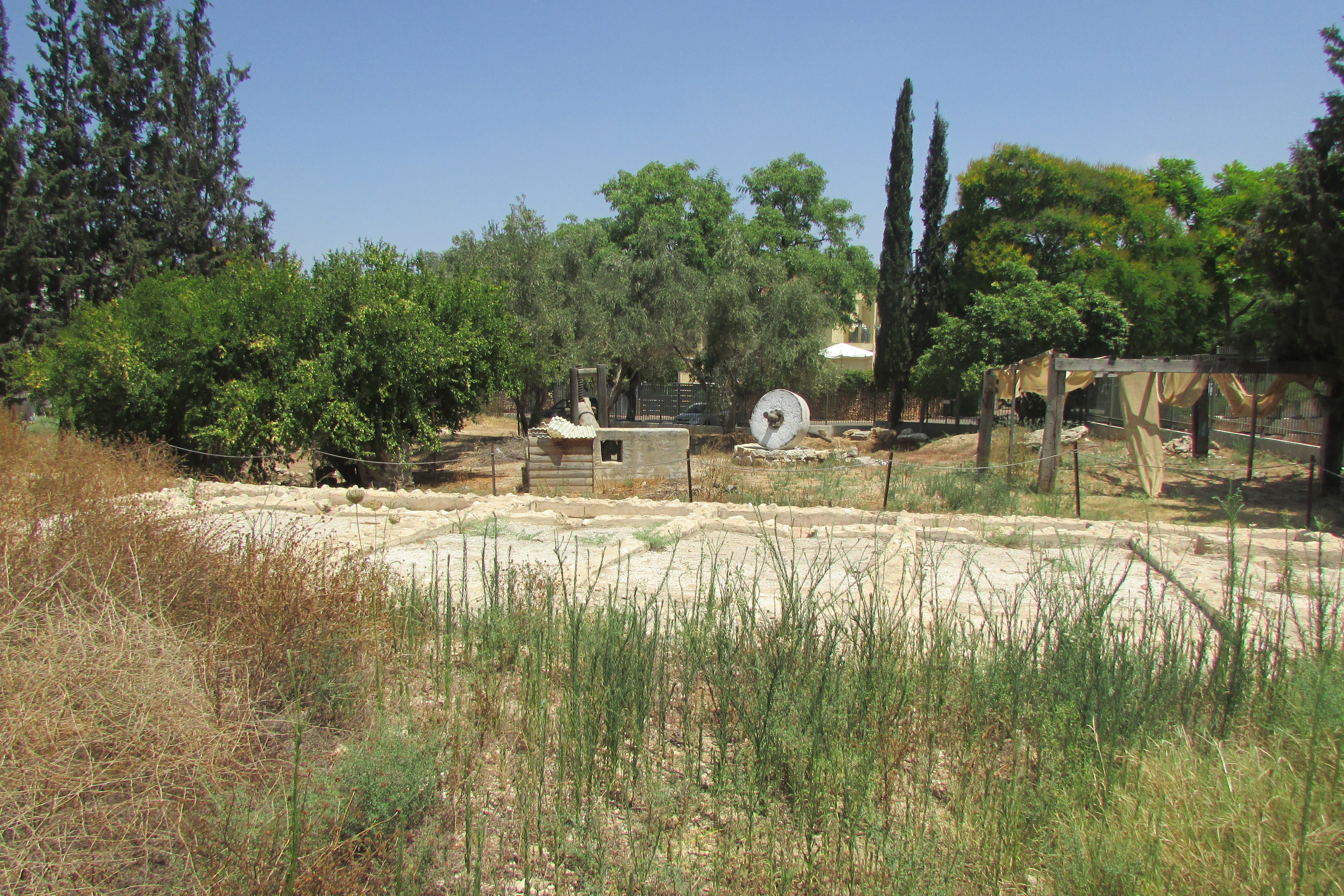
Archeological Garden on the remains of the Palestinian village of Kafr Saba.

In May 1948, when Israeli independence was declared, Kfar Saba had a population of approximately 5,500. Following the war, it rapidly expanded as many Jewish immigrants from Arab and Muslim countries settled there, and new housing projects were built to accommodate them. The town found itself at the narrowest point of Israeli territory, with just 14 km from the sea to the West Bank village of Qalqilya. It expanded over the depopulated Arab village of Kafr Saba, the site of which is today located in the Shikun Kaplan area of the city. As it became obvious that agriculture alone could not support the economy, an industrial zone was established. In 1953, the population was about 15,000. Meir Hospital was opened in 1956.

The rapid growth of the town meant that its status as a moshava was outdated, and it was granted city status in 1962, with head of the local council, Mordechai Surkis, becoming its first mayor. The city had a population of 19,000 at the time. After receiving its city status, a court, a police branch, and offices of the National Insurance Institute and the Israel Tax Authority were established in Kfar Saba. Agriculture also continued to decline in importance in the city's economy as new factories were built. Despite this, the city still had thousands of acres of orchards in the late 1960s.

During the Six-Day War in 1967, two neighborhoods in Kfar Saba were shelled by Jordanian artillery, and an attack on a factory by Jordanian warplanes killed four workers. Following the war, the population increased as many people moved to Kfar Saba from the Gush Dan area, and during Soviet-Jewish immigration to Israel in the early 1970s, the city took in many Soviet immigrants and established an immigrant absorption center. In 1977, Kfar Saba had a population of 35,000.

==== First and Second Intifada ====
Kfar Saba is located just across the Green Line from the Palestinian city of Qalqilya. During times of relative peace, residents of Kfar Saba would shop in Qalqilya: this practice ended at the start of the First Intifada in 1987. In the following years, Kfar Saba became a frequent target of Palestinian terror attacks. In April 2001, a Palestinian suicide bomber wearing an explosive belt killed a doctor and wounded 50 at a bus stop in Kfar Saba. In March 2002, a Palestinian opened fire on passersby at a major intersection, killing an Israeli girl and wounding 16 before being shot dead. In April 2003, a Palestinian suicide bomber blew himself up at the Kfar Saba train station during the morning rush hour, killing a security guard and wounding 10 bystanders.

==== Israel Hamas conflict ====
On 25 March 2019, a rocket hit a private home injuring 7.

On 26 May, rockets were fired from Rafah towards Central Israel around 2 pm. One landed in Kfar Saba, creating a large crater; no serious injuries were reported.

==== 2026 Iran war ====
In late March 2026, two homes were damaged as a result of falling interceptor debris during the 2026 Iran war.

== Demographics ==
Year	Population
1972	27,300
1983	43,500
1995	68,100
2008	82,800
2022	100,262
2024	99,410

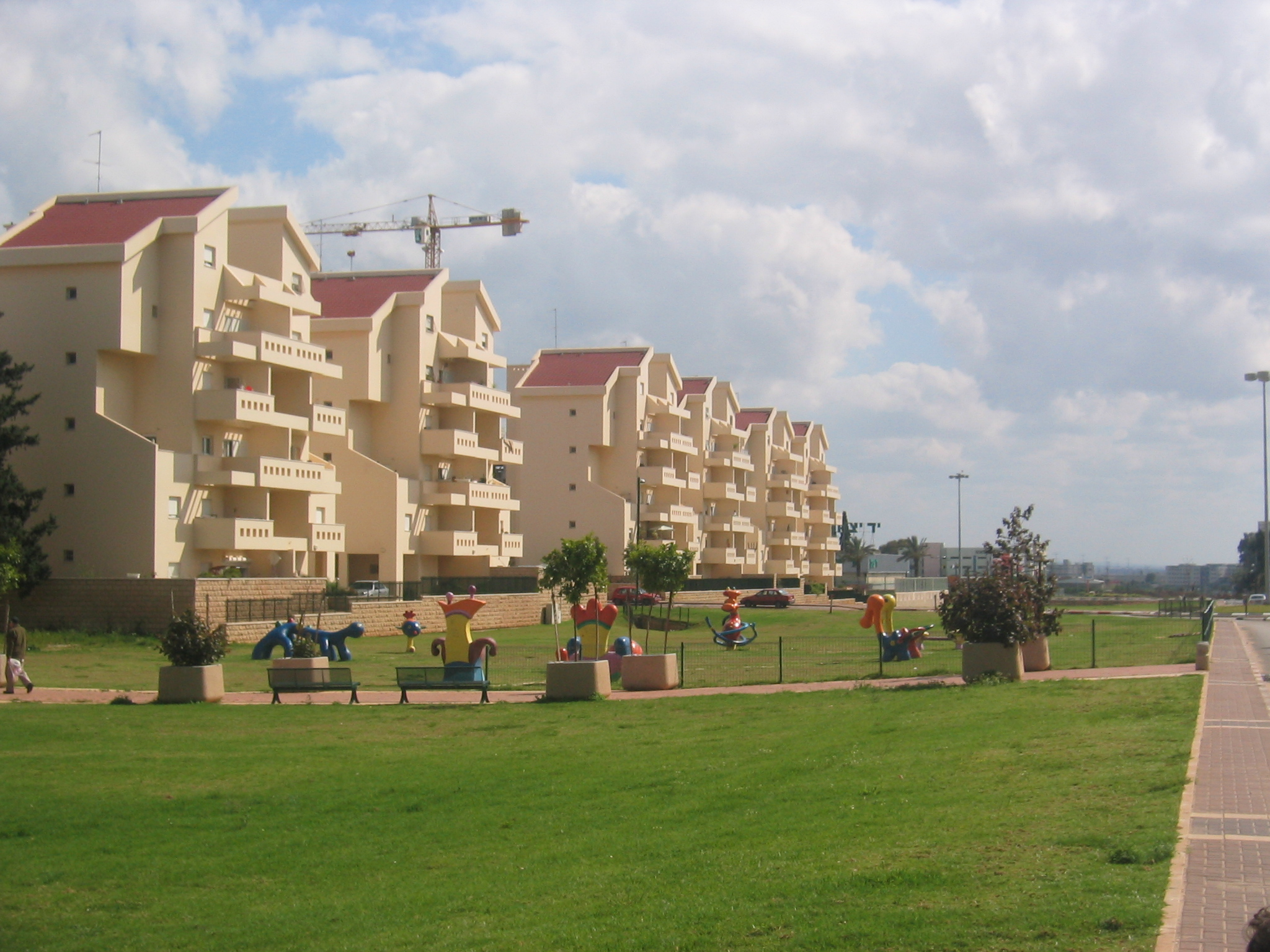
Hadarim neighborhood, Kfar Saba

The 1922 census of Palestine listed the population of Kfar Saba as 14 Jews. By the 1931 census it had grown to 1,405 inhabitants, all Jews, in 395 houses.

In the 1945 statistics, the town had a population of 4,320 Jews.

According to the Israel Central Bureau of Statistics (CBS), in 2001, the ethnic makeup of the city was 99.9% Jewish and 0.1% Others. Additionally, there were 523 immigrant residents. Also according to the CBS, there were 37,000 males and 39,600 females in 2001. The population of the city was spread out, with 31.1% 19 years of age or younger, 16.3% between 20 and 29, 17.7% between 30 and 44, 20.2% from 45 to 59, 3.5% from 60 to 64, and 11.3% 65 years of age or older. The population growth rate was 2.0% for that year.

The city is ranked high on the socio-economic scale (8 out of 10). Kfar Saba has a listed population surpassing 110,000 as of 2019.

The CBS reported that for the 2024 year, Kfar Saba ranked highest among all Israeli cities in job satisfaction, overall life expectancy, satisfaction with parks and green spaces, quietness, and general trust in others, and that there were no reported instances of fatalities from traffic incidents.

== Economy ==
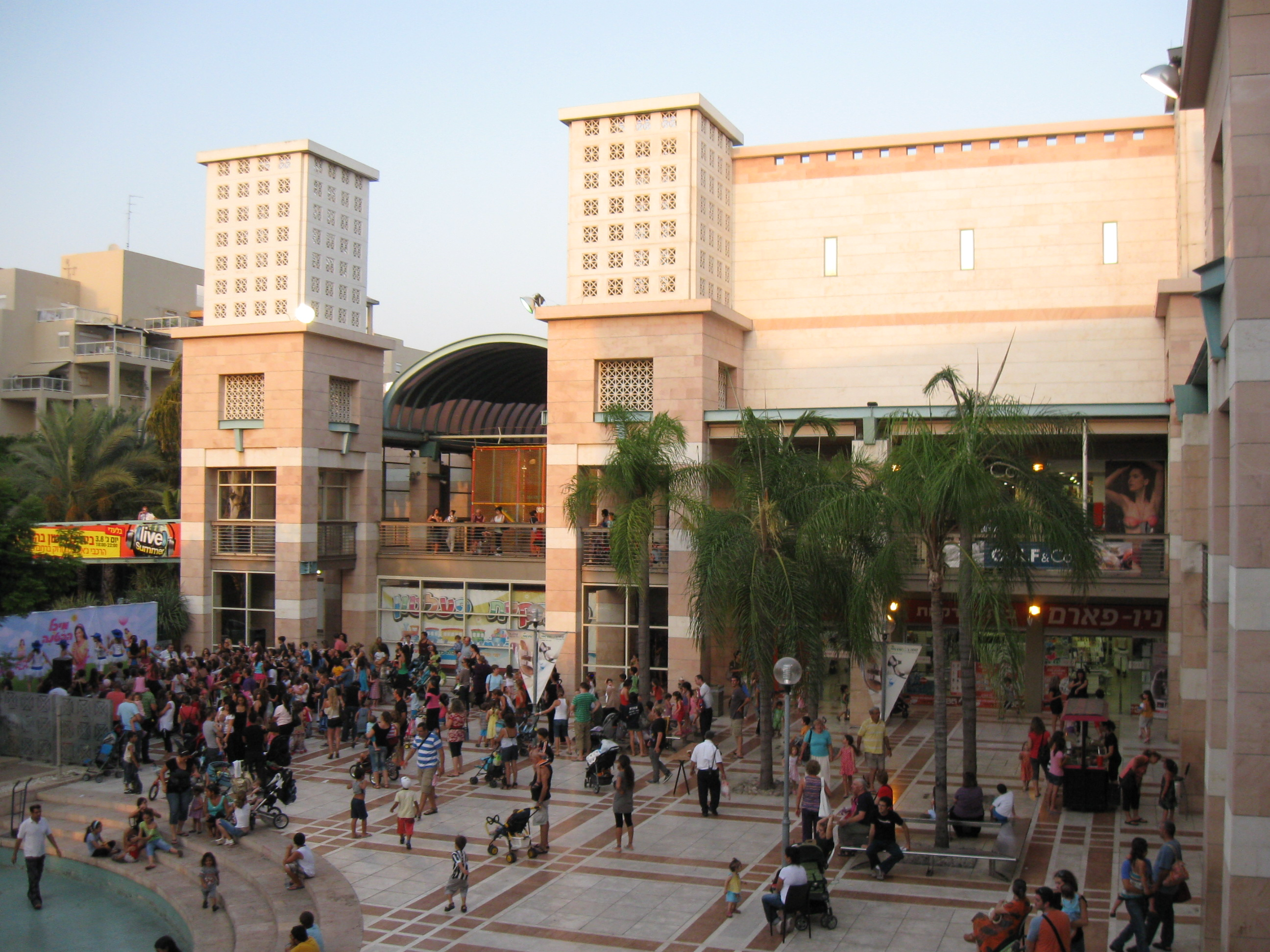
Arim Mall in downtown Kfar Saba

According to CBS, there were 31,528 salaried workers and 2,648 self-employed in Kfar Saba in 2000. The mean monthly wage in 2000 for a salaried worker was ILS 7,120, a real change of 10.1% over the course of 2000. Salaried males had a mean monthly wage of ILS 9,343 (a real change of 9.9%) versus ILS 5,033 for females (a real change of 9.7%). The mean income for the self-employed was 8,980. 1,015 people received unemployment benefits and 1,682 people received an income guarantee.

In May 2004 the exploration company Givot Olam Oil said that the Meged-4 oil well, located northeast of Kfar Saba, has exceeded original predictions and contains an extremely valuable deposit of oil.

== Schools and religious institutions ==
Currently, in Kfar Saba there are 18 elementary schools (5 of them are religious elementary schools), 8 middle schools (2 of them are religious middle schools) and 11 high schools (4 of them are religious high schools). The high schools in Kfar Saba are divided to 3 groups: urban high schools (5), ORT high schools (2) and religious high schools (4).

The city is served by 105 synagogues.

== Healthcare ==
Meir Hospital is located in Kfar Saba. Meir Hospital is a major medical center named for Josef Meir, the first head of the General Sick Fund. The hospital accepts all patients, Jews and Palestinians, including patients from cities within the jurisdiction of the Palestinian Authority, such as Qalqilyah.

== Environmental issues ==
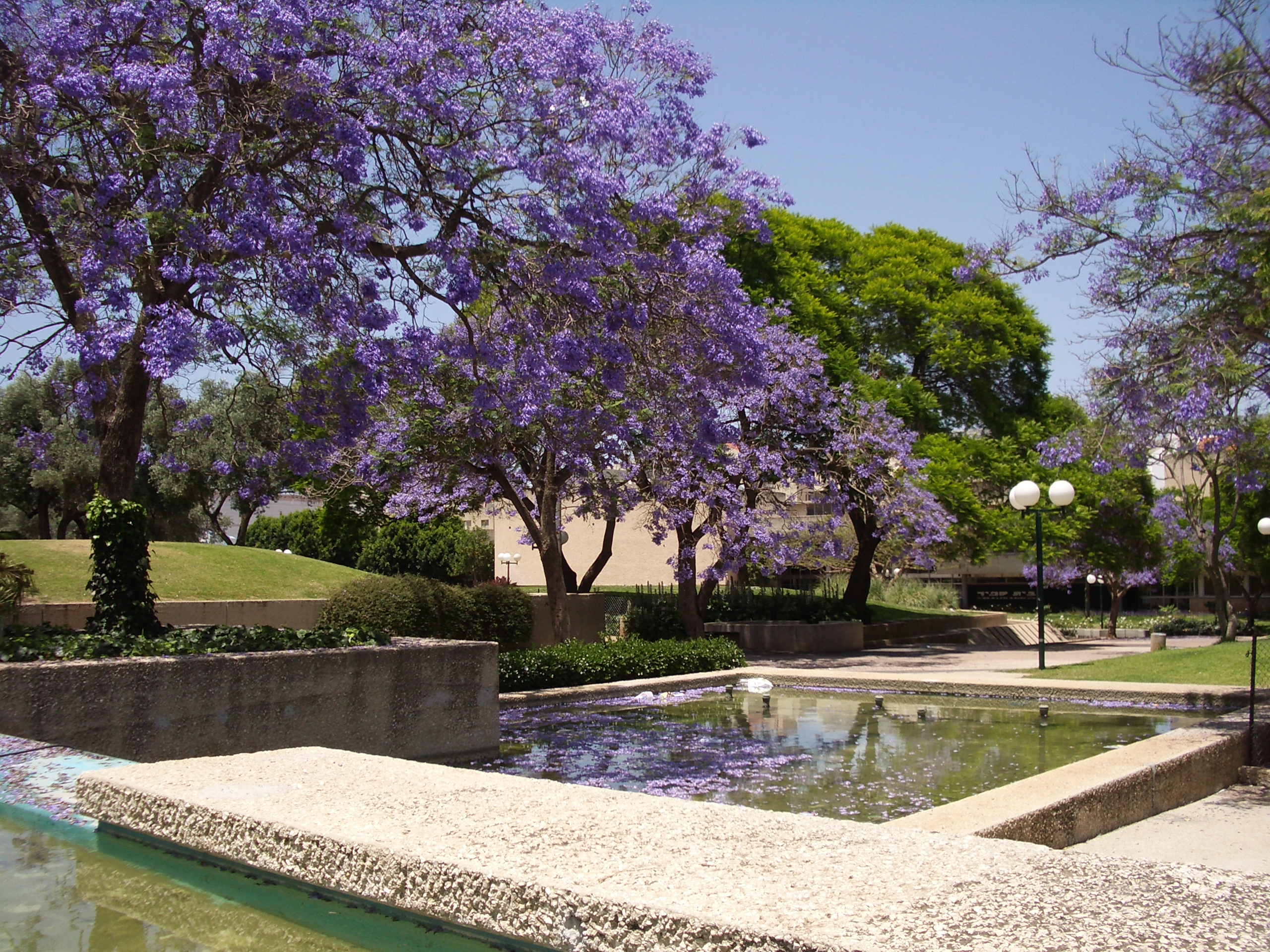
Kfar Saba during the spring

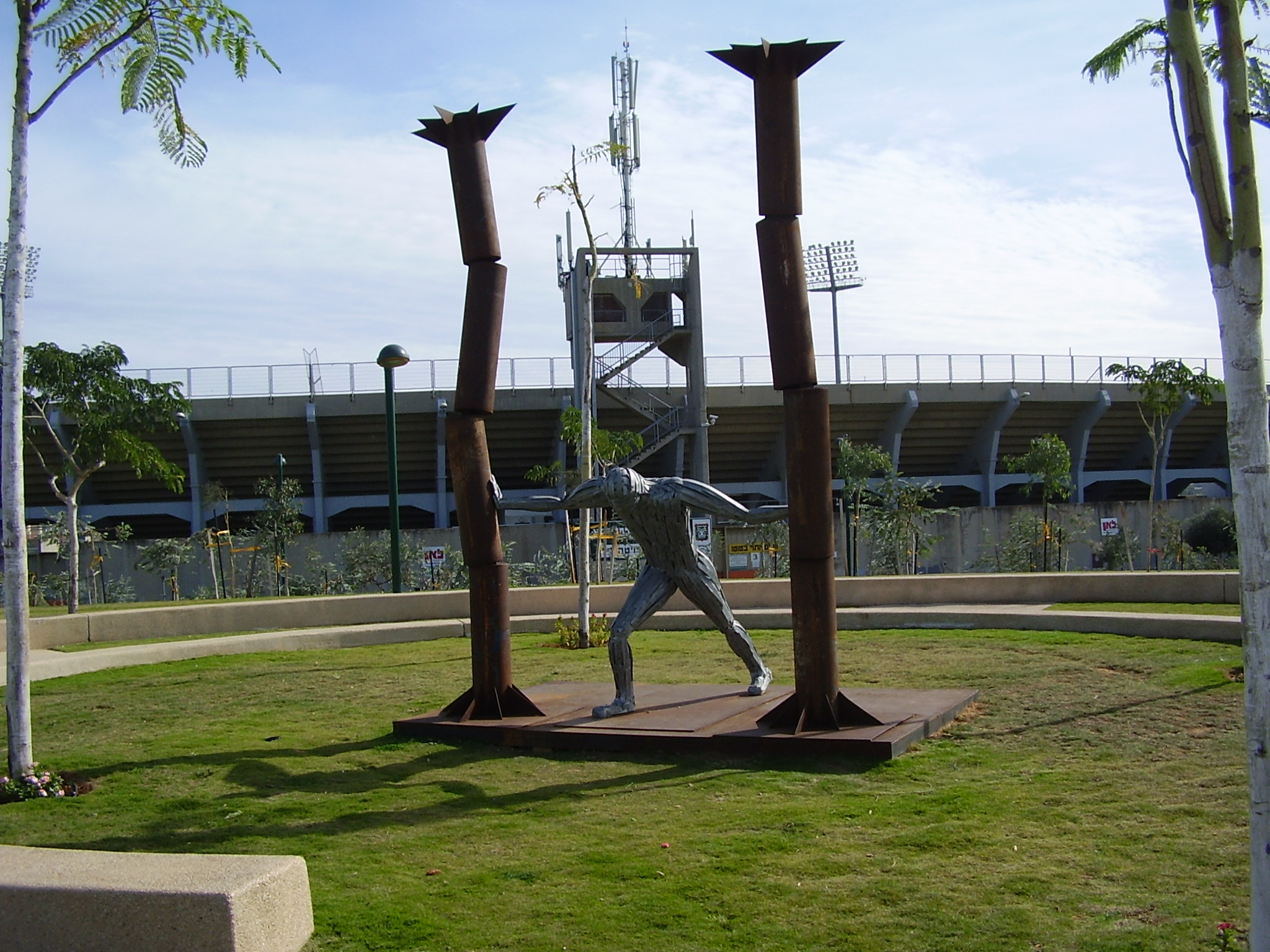
Samson sculpture at the Kfar Saba park

Kfar Saba has won multiple awards for environment protection efforts. Kfar Saba is also the site of Israel's first biofilter project.

== Landmarks ==
=== Nabi Yamin ===
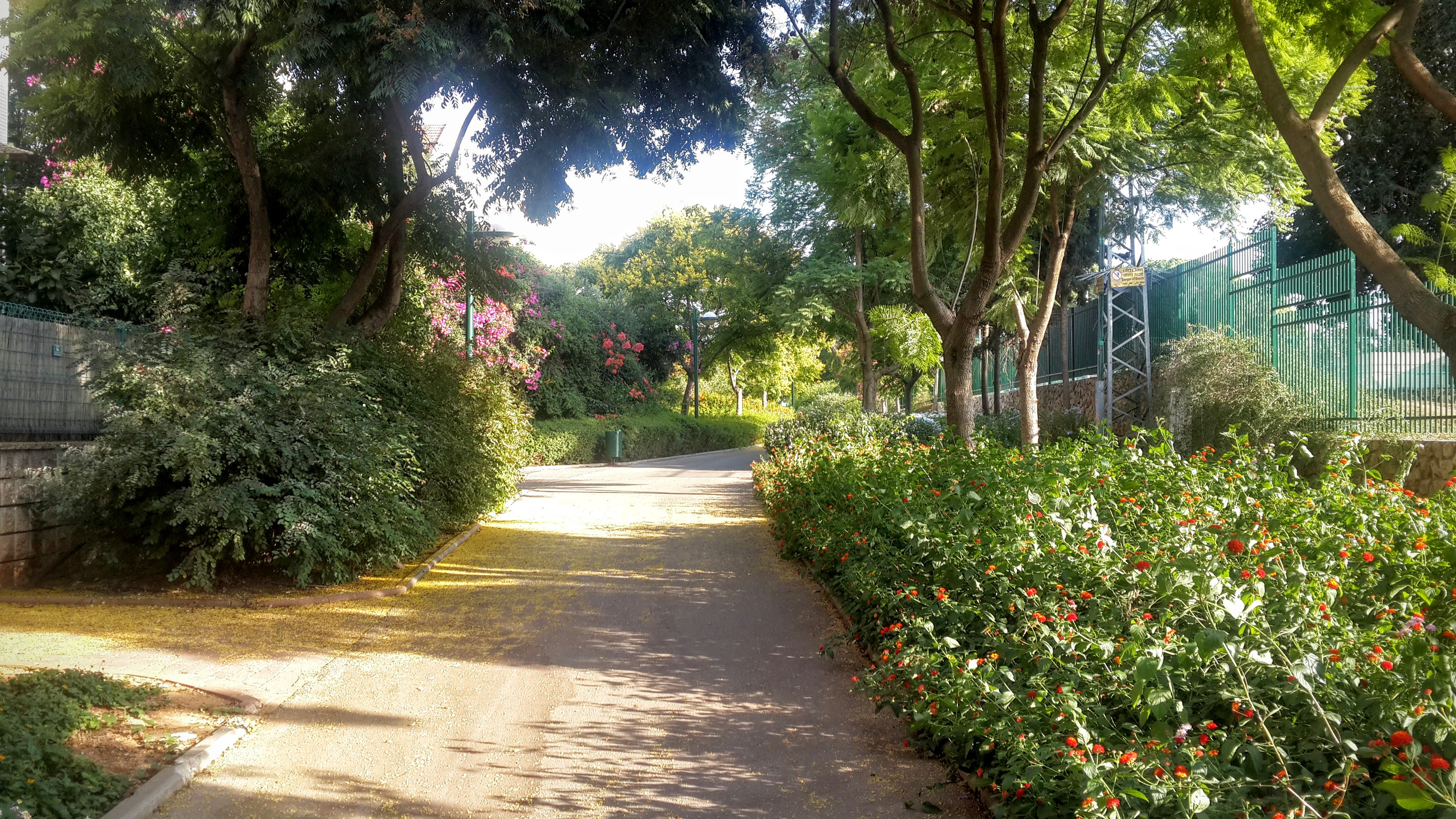
Kdoshei Kahir park in Kfar Saba.

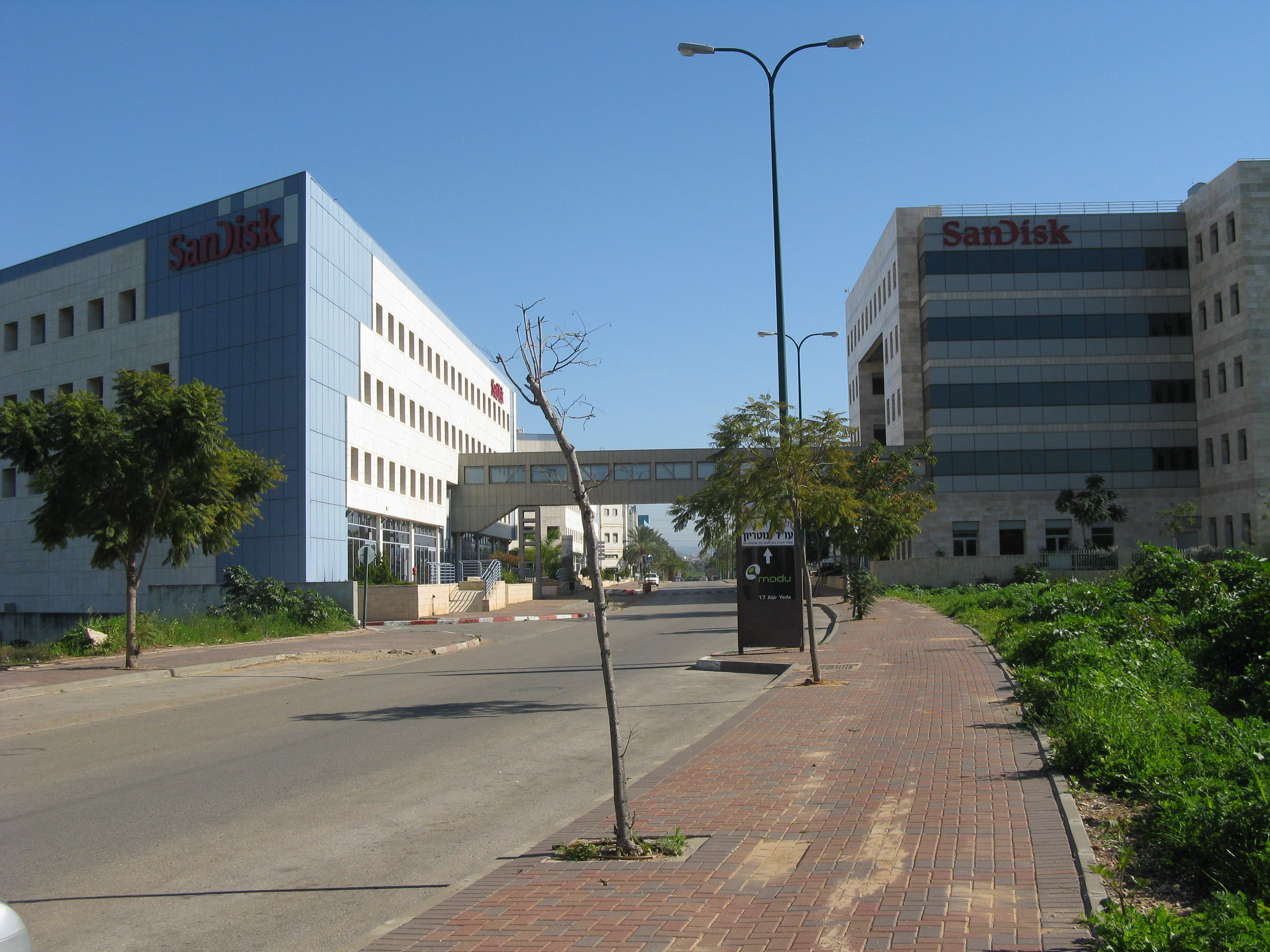
Western Digital's Israel facility

A Mamluk caravanserai complex, including the mausoleum of Nabi Yamin, is located by the Kfar Saba – Qalqilyah road. The site contains an inscription dated to the 14th century. The site has been associated with the tomb of Benjamin, son of Jacob. North of this complex is a smaller tomb whose cupola has been painted green and is being maintained by local Palestinian Muslims, who consider it the "real" tomb. Jews and Muslims venerate Benjamin. Kfar Saba is in the heart of Dan's tribal area, but there are traditions that explain why Benjamin's tomb is located in the land of the tribe of Dan. The traditional burial place of Simeon, son of Jacob, lies close to Kfar Saba. It is a small domed structure that sits in a field not far from kibbutz Eyal. According to Meron Benvenisti, the site was until 1948 only holy to Muslims, and Jews ascribed no holiness to it. Today the dedicated inscriptions from the Mamluk period remain engraved on the stone walls of the tomb but the cloths embroidered with verses from the Qur´an, with which the gravestones were draped, have been replaced by draperies bearing verses from the Hebrew Bible.

=== First well ===
The modern development of Kfar Saba started when water was discovered in the early 1920s. The first well was excavated at this time, followed by many others over the next two decades. The Kfar Saba Water Plant was founded to centralize the water supply system. The city's first well is located in the courtyard of Kfar Saba City Hall.

=== Amrami's dairy farm ===
The site of the dairy farm of Baruch Amrami, who transferred the administration of the Kfar Saba settlement from Petah Tikva to a local committee and founded the water company and the first bank of the village in the 1920s, is on the corner of Amrami and Rothschild Streets. The cowshed and Amrami's "office" are still standing.

=== Nordenstein house ===
Due to the lack of security during World War I, the settlement was abandoned. In 1922, the Nordenstein family returned and built the first defensible stone house. It took another two years for other families to return (mostly from Petah Tikva). The Nordenstein House is still standing on HaEmek Street, near the central bus station.

=== Kibbutz HaKovesh dining hall ===
A stone house on Tel Hai Street designed for defense (outlooks and sharp-shooting parapets) served as the communal dining room of Kibbutz HaKovesh. The pioneers themselves lived in tents. In 1948, the kibbutz moved north to secure the Kalkiliya front. The building now houses the Kfar Saba Civil Guard.

=== City's Park ===
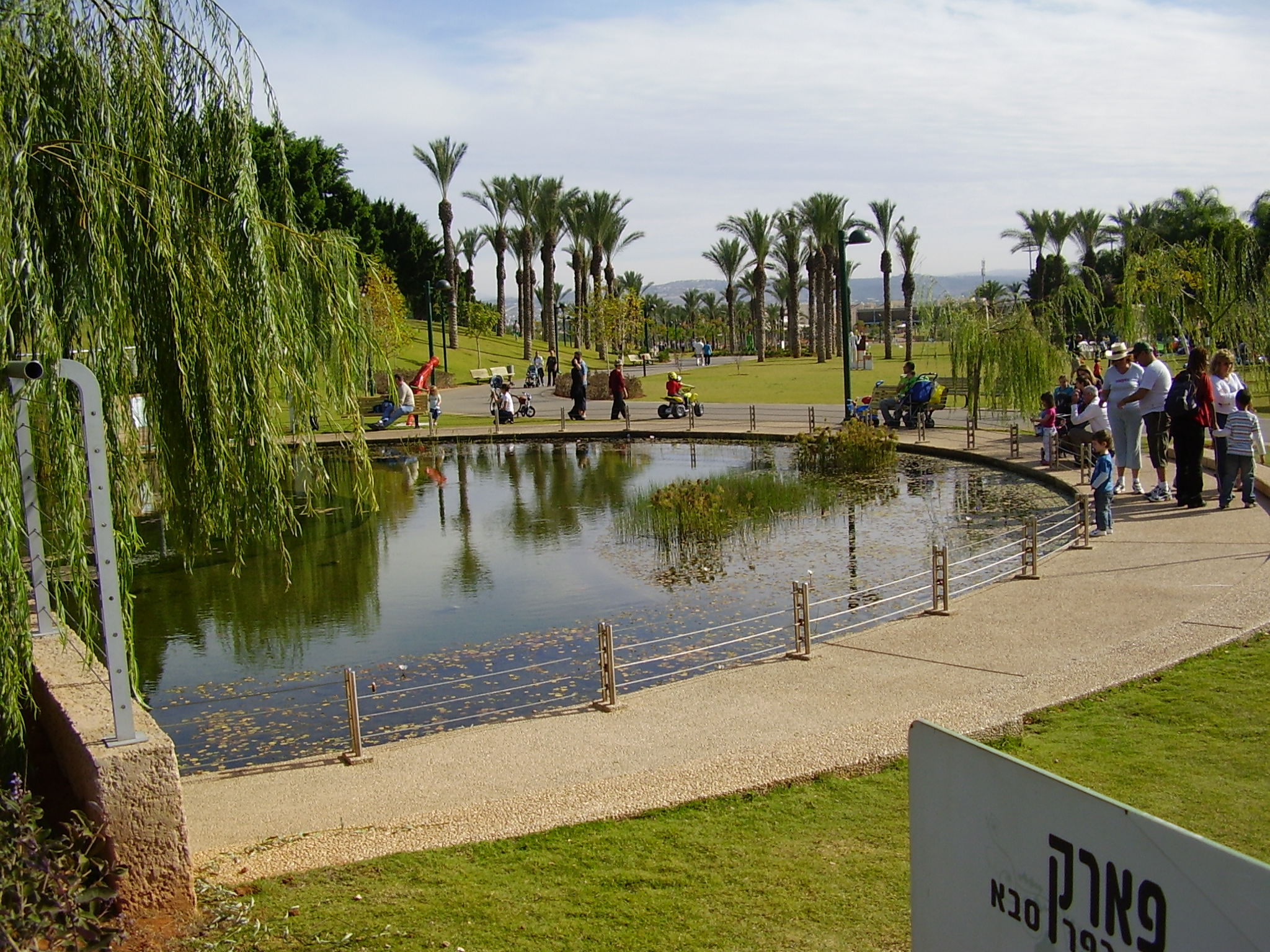
Kfar Saba park

Kfar Saba's Park is one of the biggest parks in the Sharon area. It has an area of 250,000 m^{2}. The park includes kids playgrounds, water fountains, roller skate arena, fitness facilities, and shaded dining areas. The park is open daily between 6:30 am and 11:00 pm. There is free parking for city residents in different locations around the park.

=== Eva Fischer Fund ===
Located in the Kfar Saba's Municipality Center is the Eva Fischer Fund, which displays artworks about the Shoah given to the city by the Italian painter.

== Archaeology ==
Remnants of an ancient Israelite village were discovered east of the city, and are believed to be the ruins of biblical Capharsaba. The Kfar Saba Archaeology Museum exhibits artifacts found in the region.

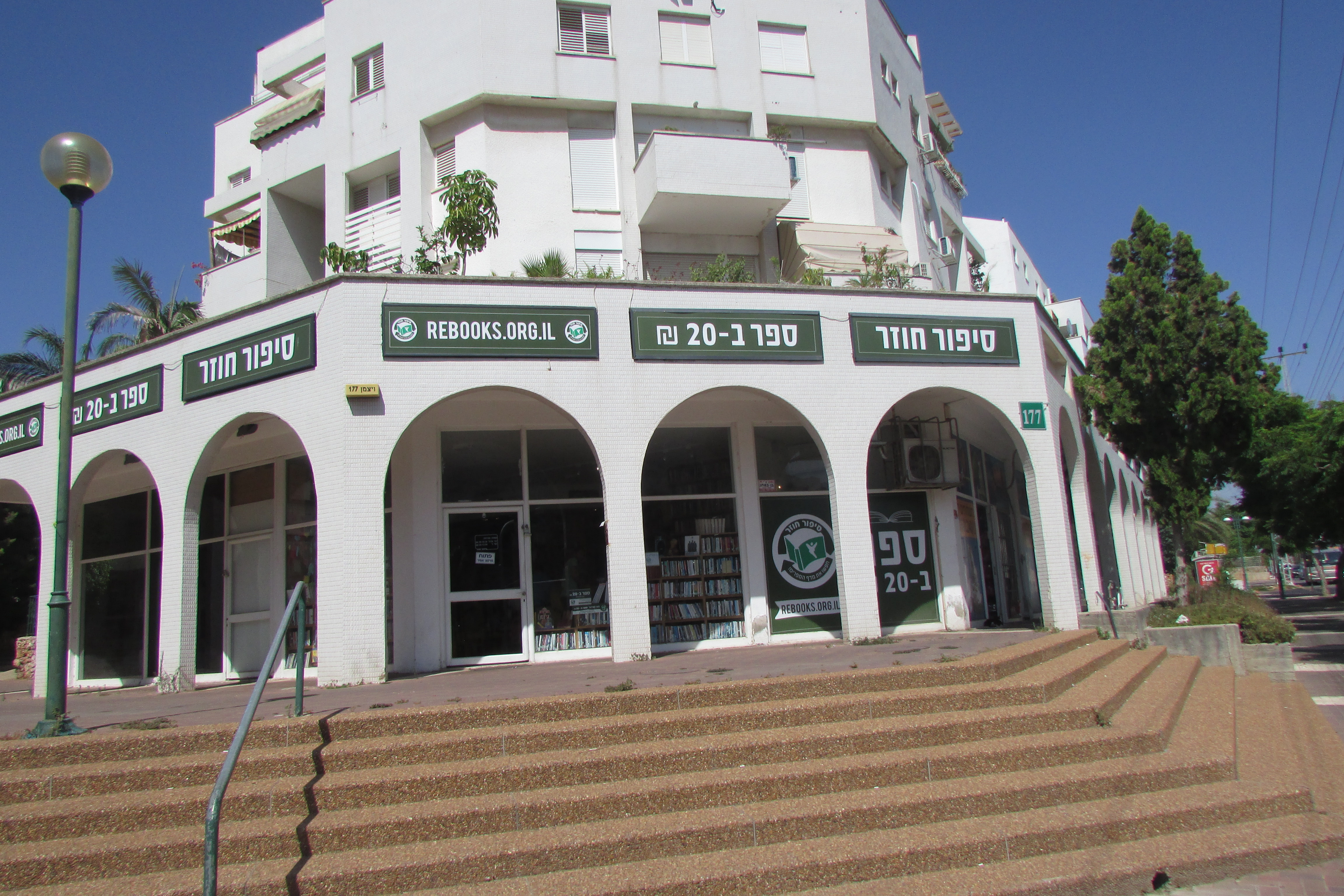
Weizmann Street, an example of building porticoes with arches in front of the stores

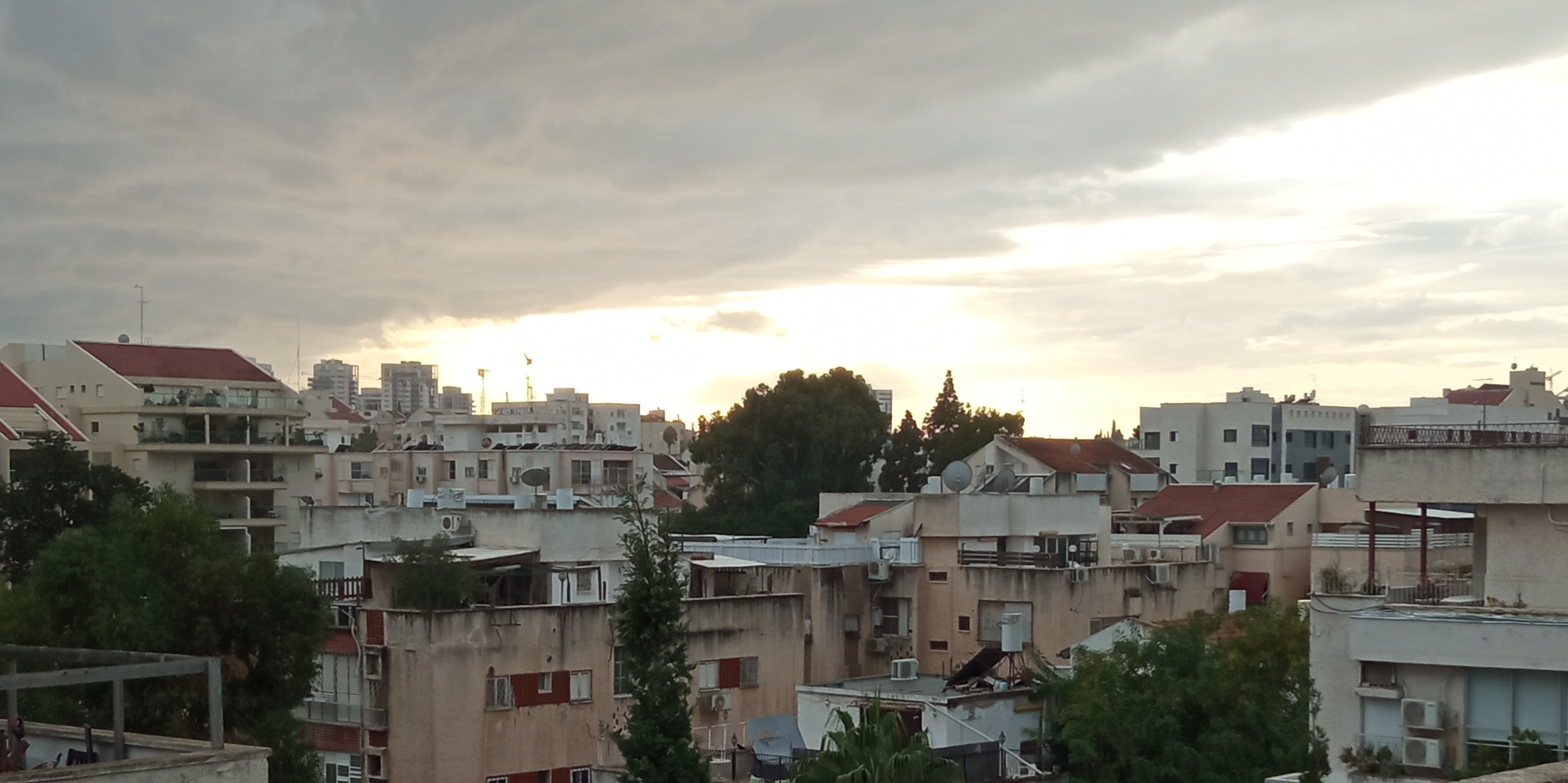
Tel Hay street. There is considerable use of tiled roofs

== Architecture ==
Kfar Saba is characterized by residential buildings with red tiled roofs. The use of red tiled roofs is evident in all types of buildings: private homes, high-rise buildings, businesses and industry. There is a widespread use of porches with arches, especially in front of the stores at Weizmann and Rothschild streets.

In 2014, the Kfar Saba Municipality decided to oblige every contractor who wants to build in the city area to install "green roofs." The meaning of green roofs is that solar panels will be installed on the roof to generate electricity from solar energy or a vegetable garden will be planted.

== Industry ==
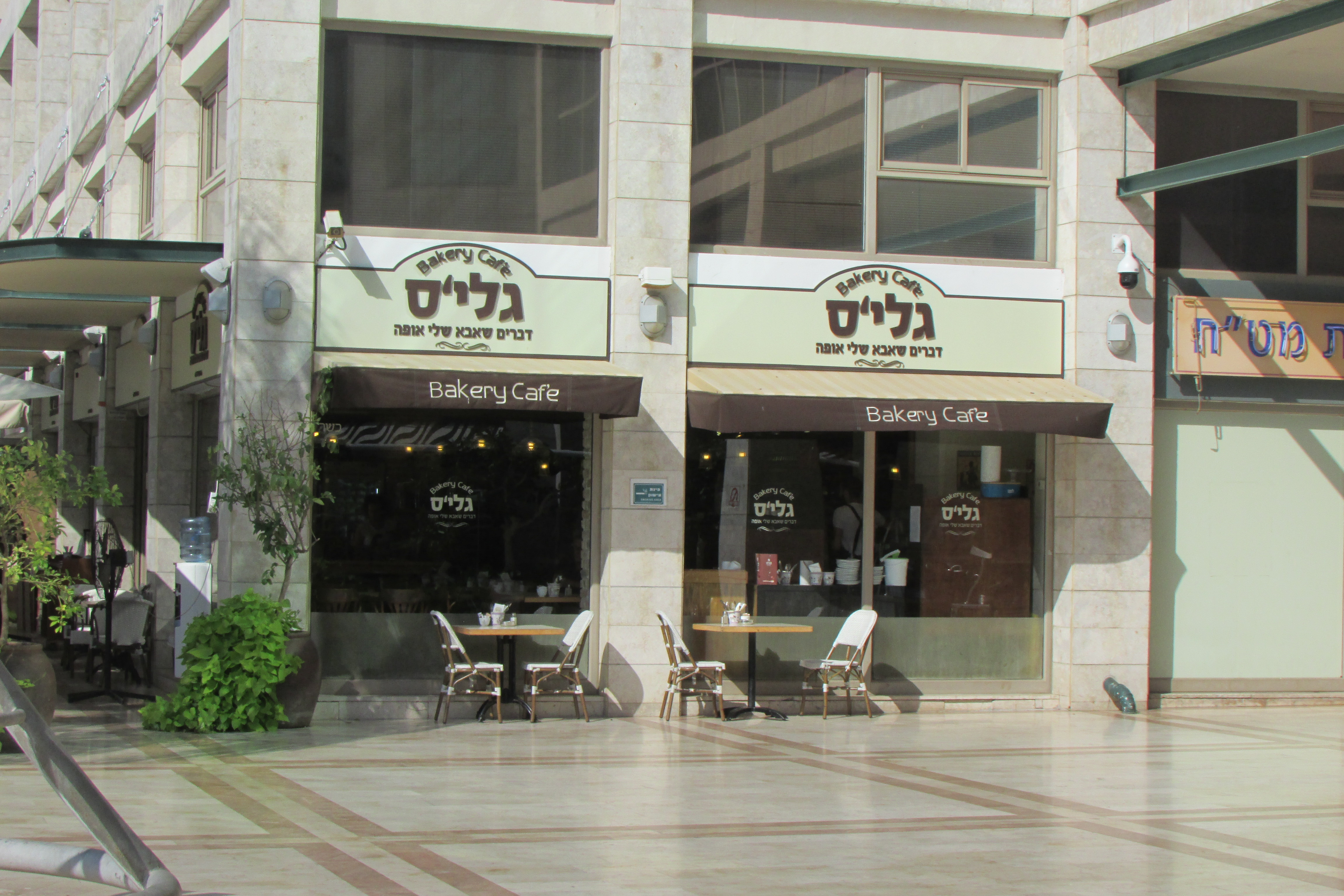
Cafe in Kfar Saba's industrial zone

Kfar Saba has one large industrial zone in the east of the city. It contains hi-tech offices and industrial plants, including Teva Pharmaceuticals' plant.

== Transportation ==
Kfar Saba is served by Kfar Saba–Nordau railway station.

== In popular culture ==
Kfar Saba was the primary filming location of FX's 2014-16 drama series Tyrant, which takes place in the fictional Arab country of Baladi.

== Voting Patterns ==
In the 2022 election, 64 percent of voters in Kfar Saba voted for the parties of the center-left coalition led by Yair Lapid, while 33 percent voted for the parties of the right-wing coalition led by Benjamin Netanyahu and 0.4 percent voted for the Arab parties.

In the 2026 election, 67 percent of voters in Kfar Saba voted for the parties of the center-left coalition led by Gadi Eisenkot, while 27 percent voted for the parties of the right-wing coalition led by Benjamin Netanyahu and 0.4 percent voted for the Arab parties. An additional 3.2 percent voted for the Reservists, and 1.6 percent voted for Amcha Yisrael. Voter turnout increased 11 percent from the 2022 election.

== Twin towns – sister cities ==
Kfar Saba is twinned with:

- Delft, Netherlands
- Gainesville, Florida, United States
- Jinan, China
- Mülheim an der Ruhr, Germany
- San José, Costa Rica
- Wiesbaden, Germany

== Notable people ==
- Oz Almog (born 1956), Israeli-Austrian artist
- Gabi Ashkenazi (born 1954), former IDF Chief
- Linoy Ashram (born 1999), rhythmic gymnastics
- Avi Ben-Chimol (born 1985), basketball player
- Dani Buller (born 1988), social media personality and influencer
- Michael Grunebaum (born 1932), first paediatric radiologist in Israel
- Miki Berkovich (born 1954), basketball player
- Matti Caspi (born 1949), musician
- Galit Chait (born 1975), Olympic ice skater
- Nili Cohen (born 1947), professor and legal expert
- Yarden Gerbi (born 1989), judoka and Olympic bronze medalist
- Eden Golan (born 2003) singer and Eurovision 2024 contestant for Israel
- Nina Pekerman (born 1977), athlete
- Sharren Haskel (born 1984), Member of Knesset
- Hanoch Kalai, Irgun cofounder and Commander in Chief, Lehi cofounder
- Moti Kirschenbaum, media personality
- David Klein, governor of the Bank of Israel
- Amos Lapidot (1934–2019), fighter pilot, 10th Commander of the Israeli Air Force, and President of Technion – Israel Institute of Technology
- Reshef Levi, writer and director
- Moran Michel (born 1978), producer, editor, social and political activist
- Noam Mills (born 1986), female Olympic fencer
- Vicky Peretz (1953–2021), international Olympic footballer
- Idan Raichel (born 1977), musician
- Sergey Richter (born 1989), Olympic sport shooter
- Nakdimon Rogel, journalist and author of the Nakdi Report
- Ravid Ronen (born 2001), actress and model
- Pinchas Sapir, politician
- Yuval Segal (born 1971), actor and comedian
- Ron Scherf (born 1972), Lt. Col. in Sayeret Matkal and co-founder of the Brothers in Arms protest movement
- Keren Siebner (born 1990), Olympic swimmer
- Gil Simkovitch (born 1982), Olympic sport shooter
- Harel Skaat (born 1981), singer
- Manor Solomon (born 1999), international association footballer (soccer player)
- Yaara Tal (born 1955), pianist
- Maor Tiyouri (born 1990), Olympic long distance runner
- Shelly Yachimovich, journalist and politician
- Israel Yinon, conductor
- Tomer Yosef, musician
- Yehoshua Zettler, Lehi commander
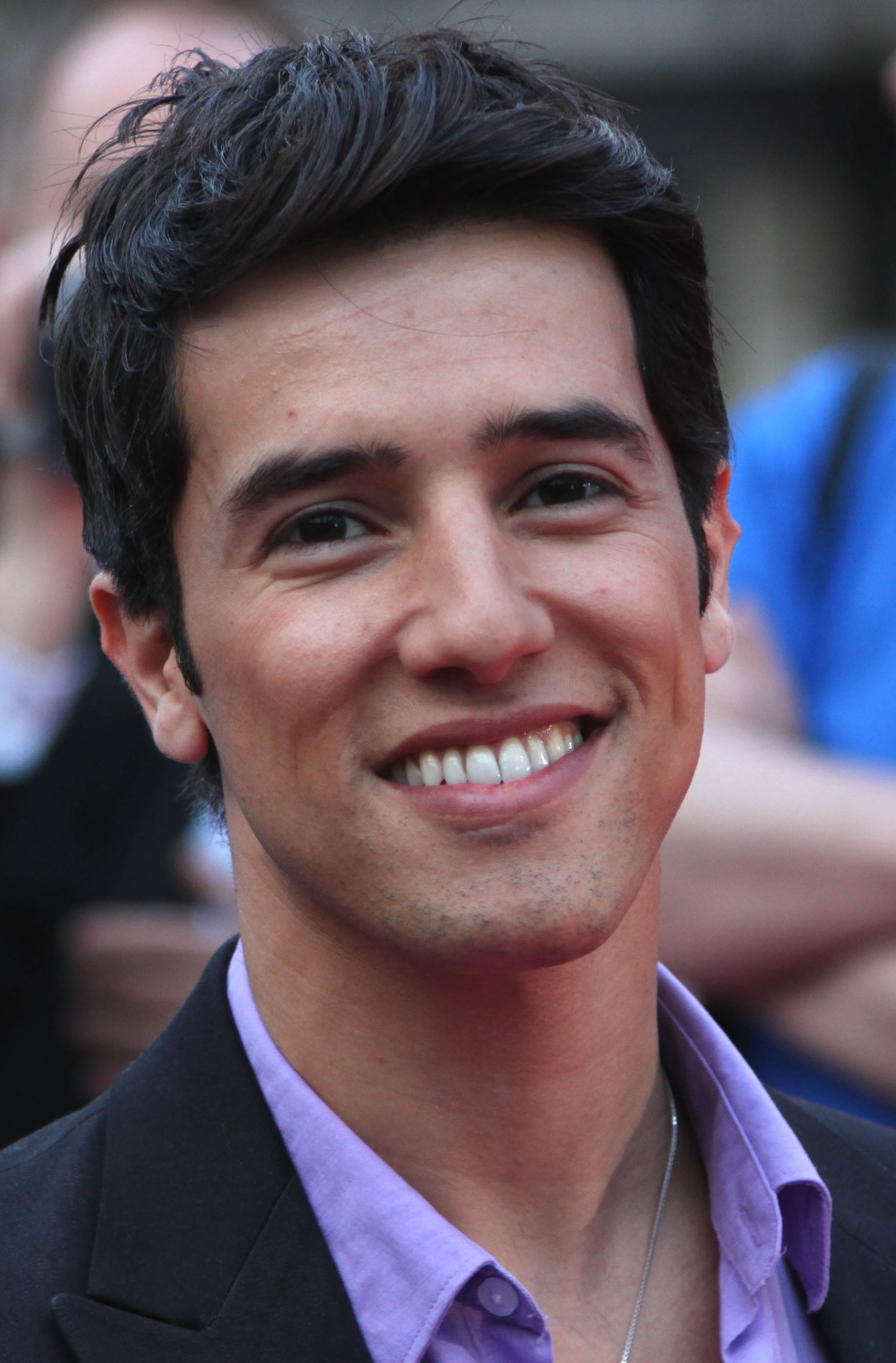
Harel Skaat

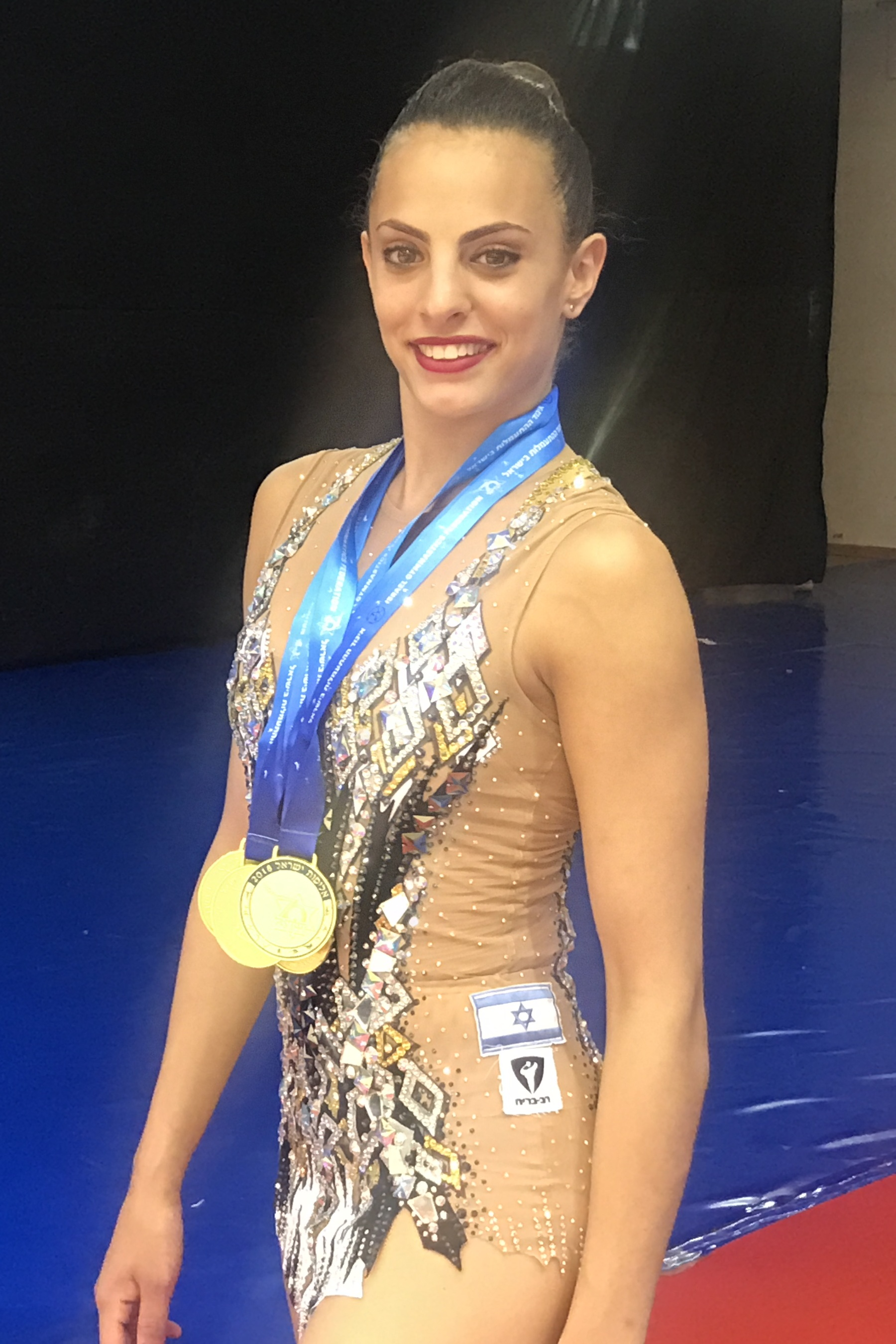
Linoy Ashram

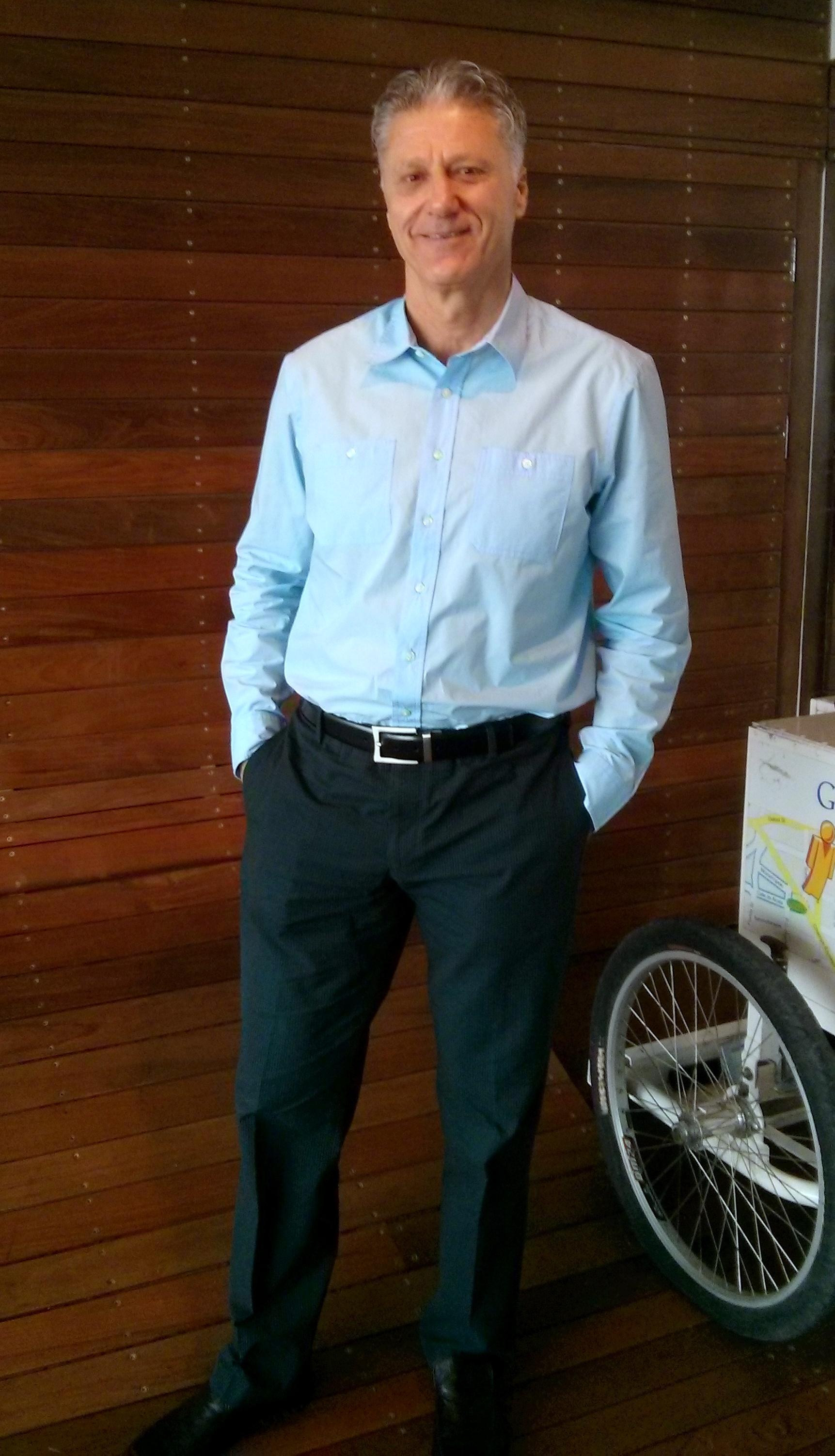
Miki Berkovich

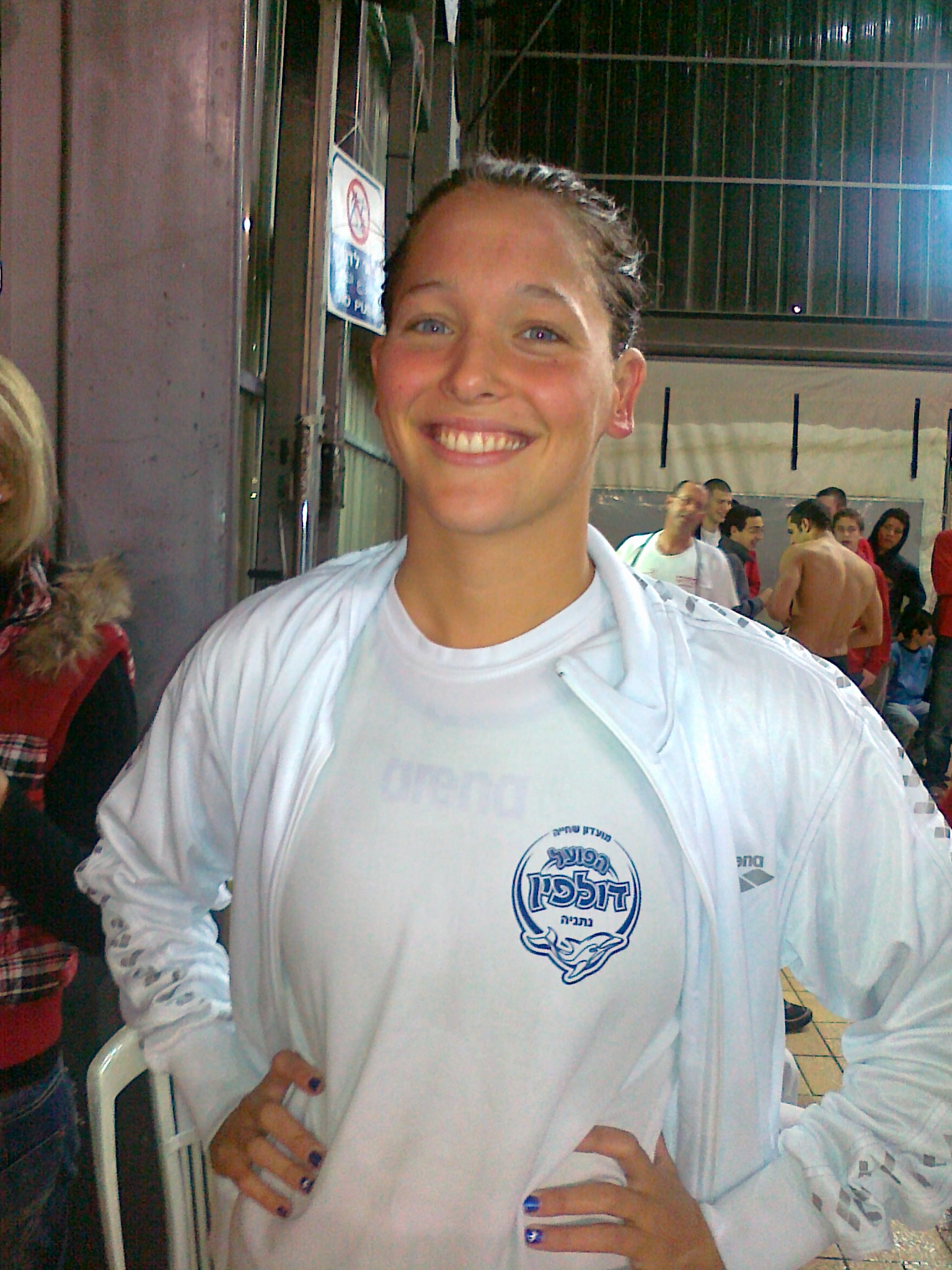
Keren Siebner

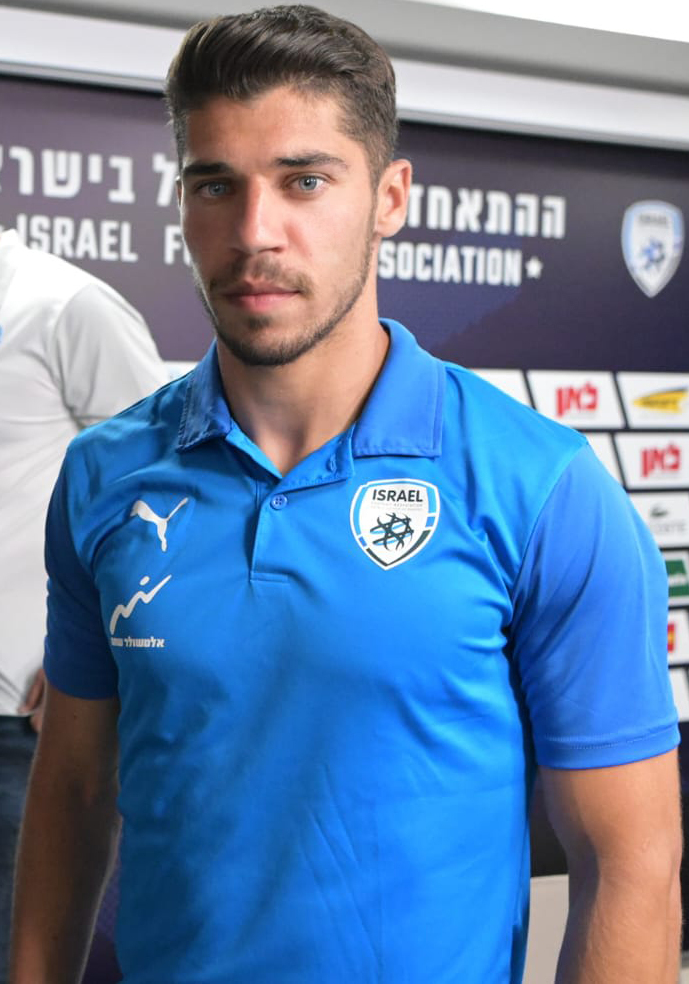
Manor Solomon

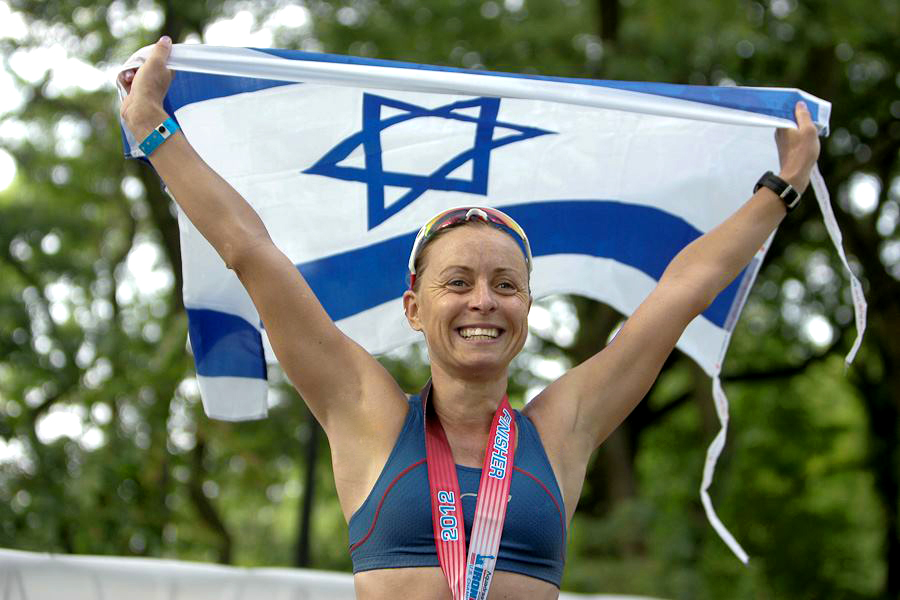
Nina Pekerman

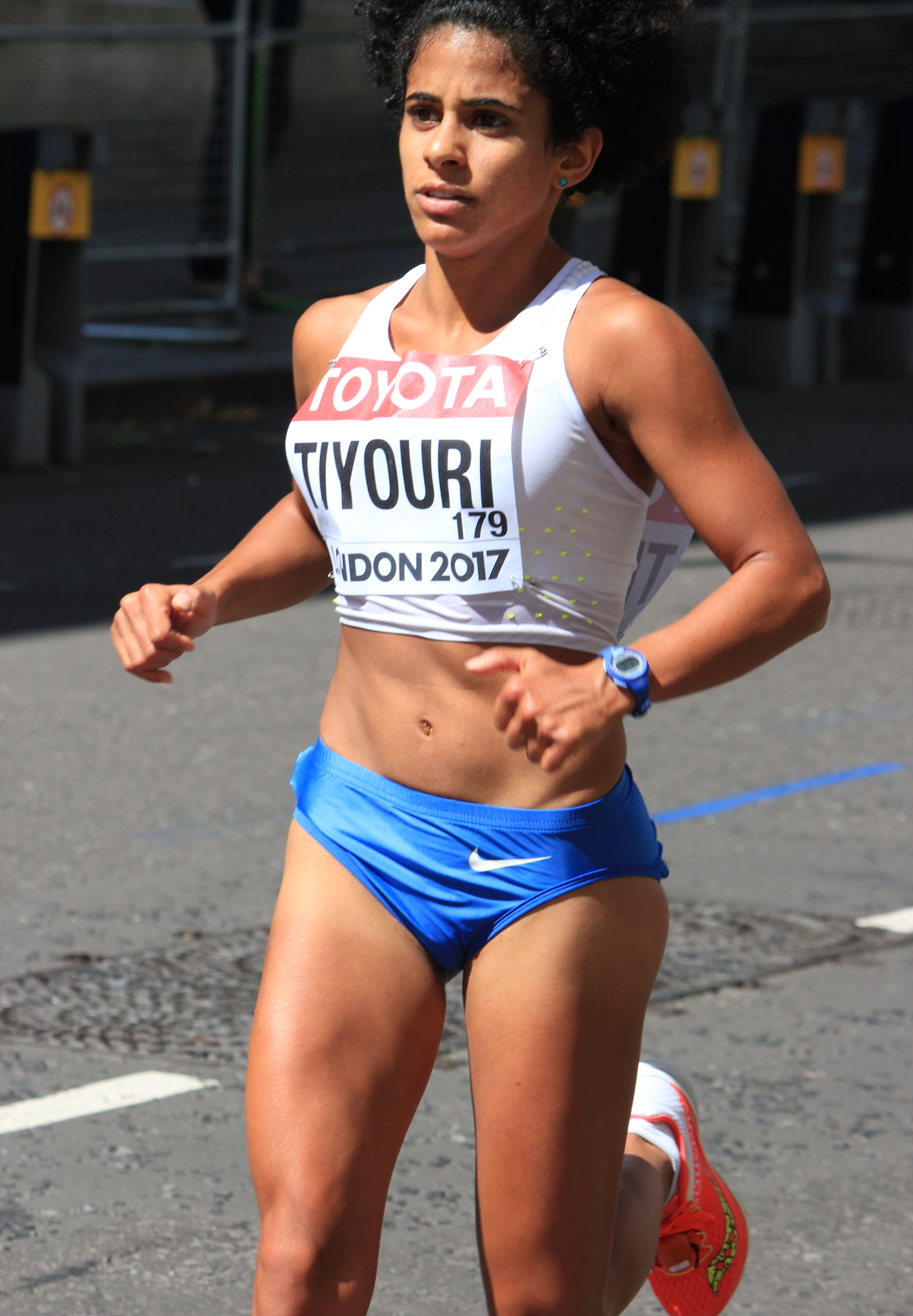
Maor Tiyouri

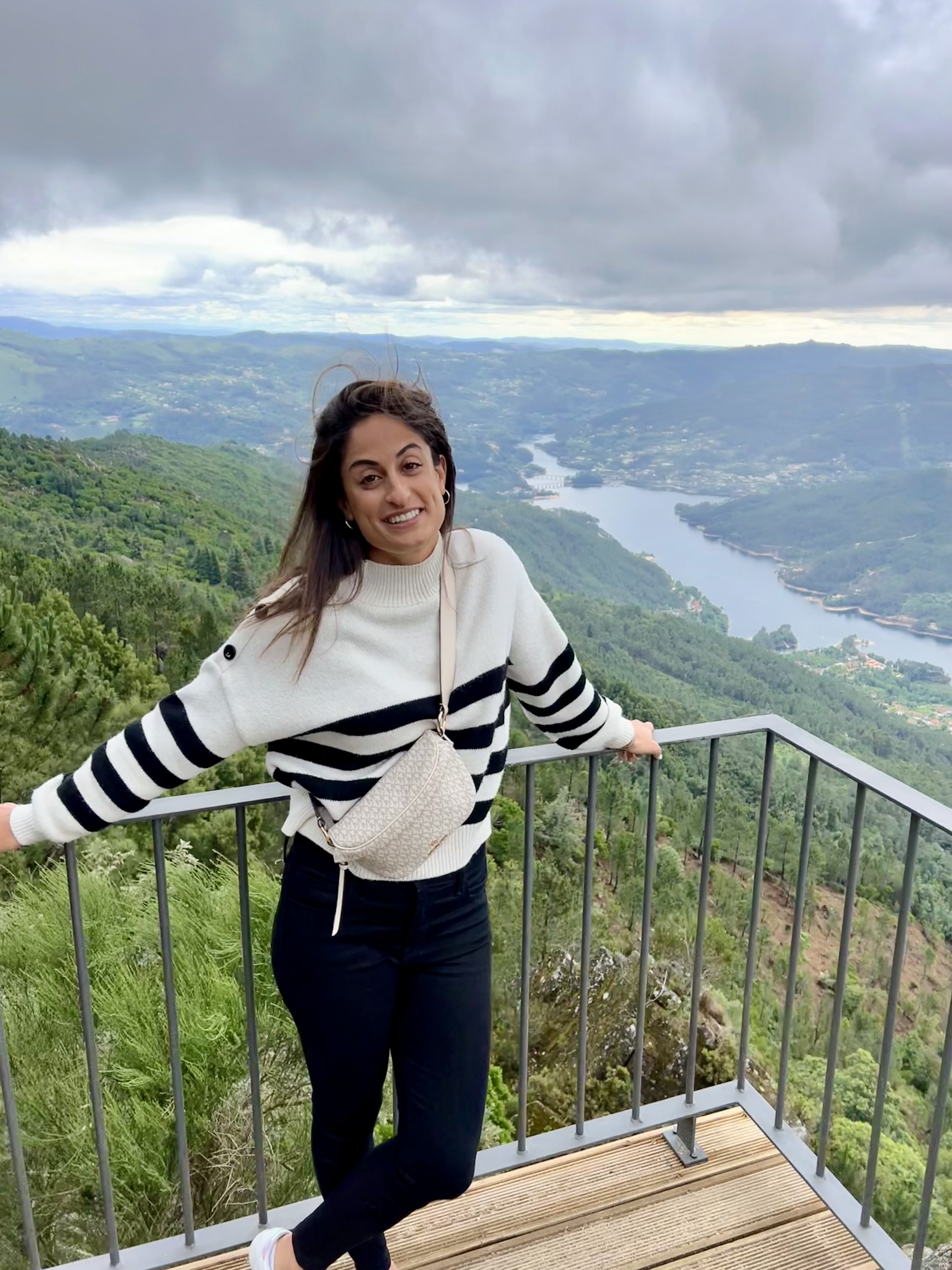
Yarden Gerbi

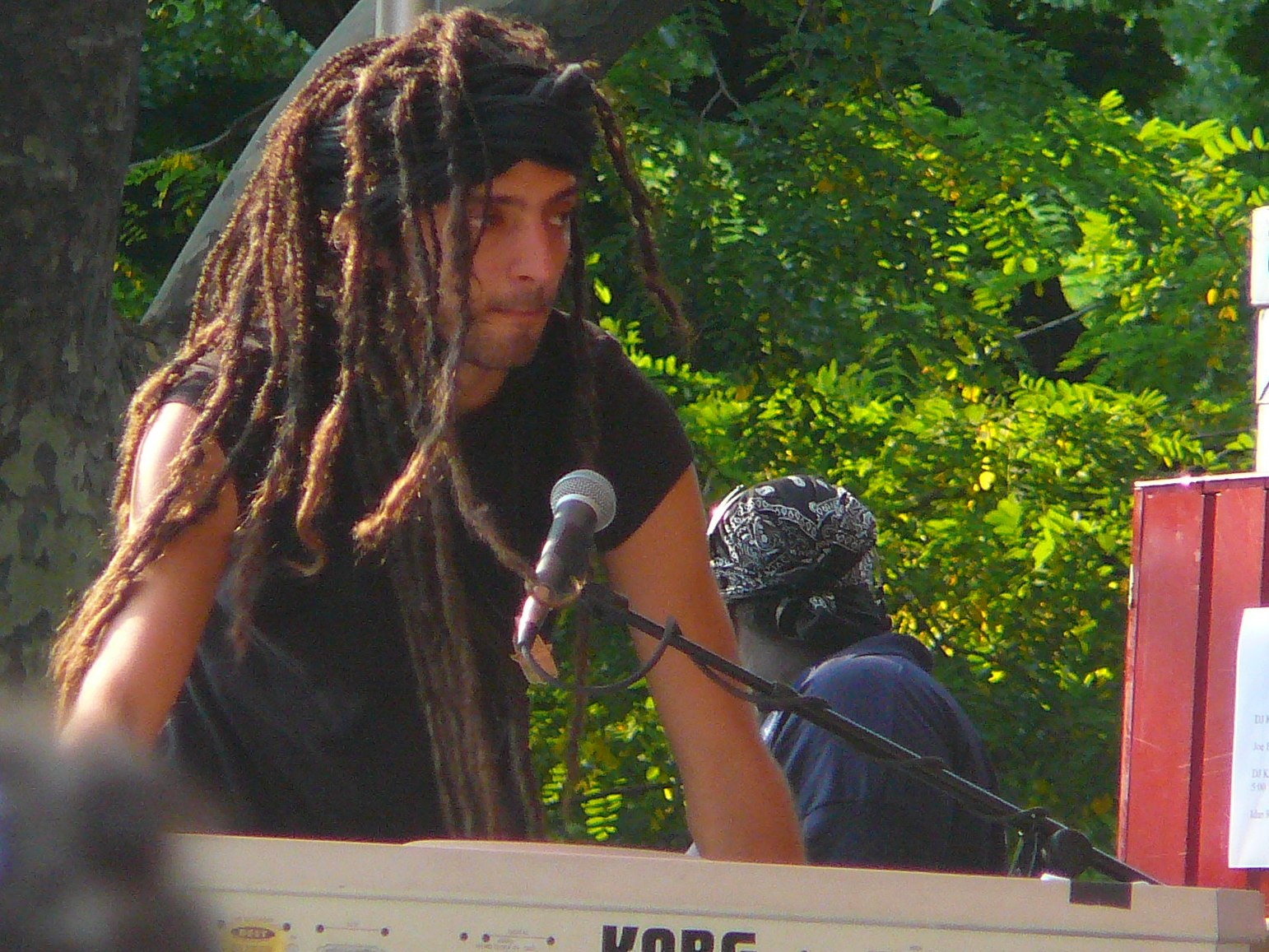
Idan Raichel

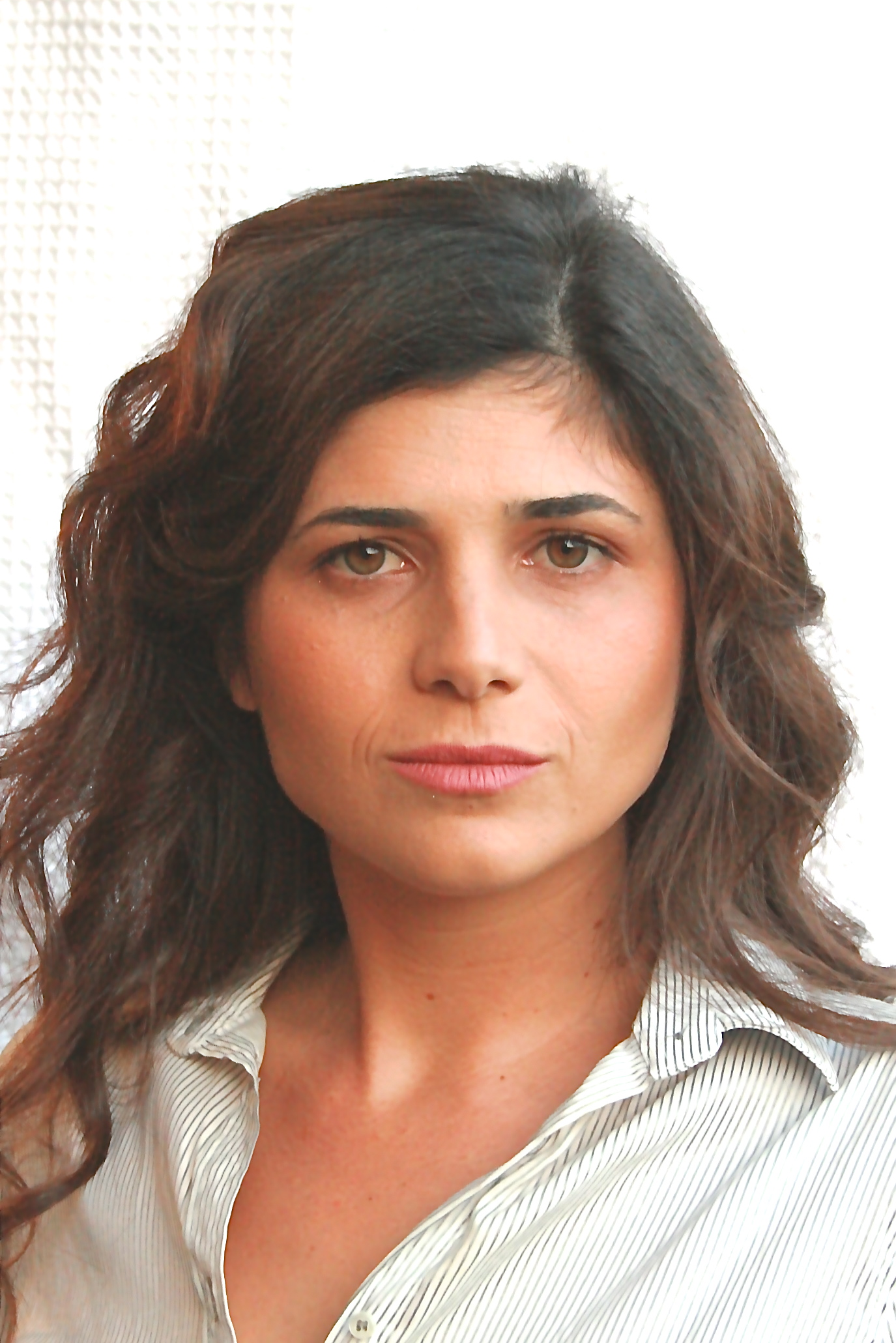
Sharren Haskel

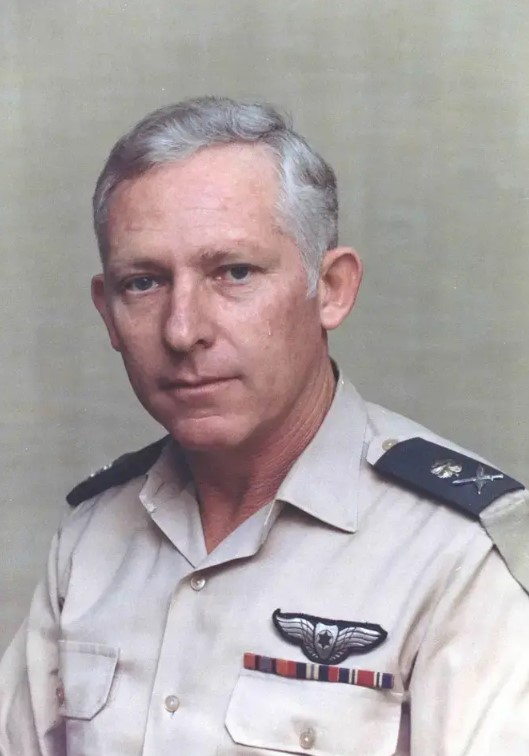
Amos Lapidot

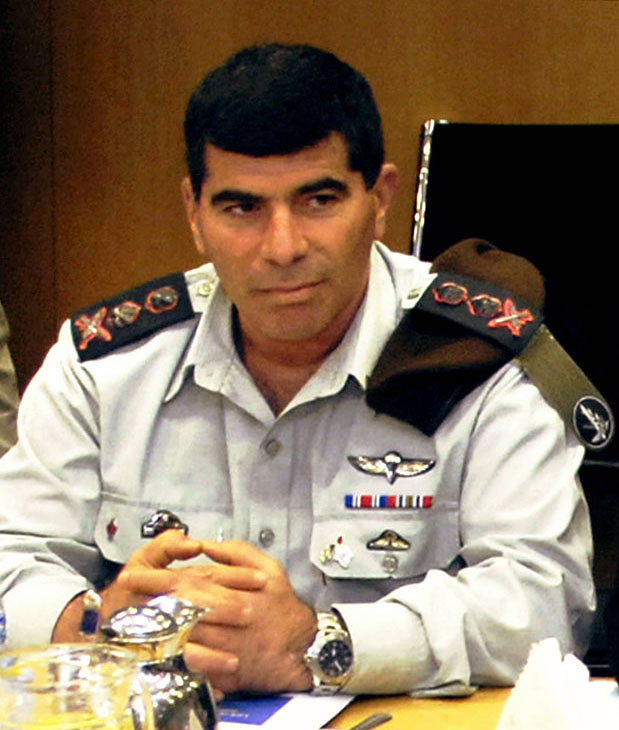
Gabi Ashkenazi

== Bibliography ==
- Barron, J.B., ed. (1923). Palestine: Report and General Abstracts of the Census of 1922. Government of Palestine.
- Government of Palestine, Department of Statistics (1945). Village Statistics, April, 1945.
- Hadawi, S. (1970). Village Statistics of 1945: A Classification of Land and Area ownership in Palestine. Palestine Liberation Organization Research Center. Archived from the original on 2018-12-08.
- Mills, E., ed. (1932). Census of Palestine 1931. Population of Villages, Towns and Administrative Areas. Jerusalem: Government of Palestine.
