= Grunebaum =

Grunebaum is a last name, e.g.:

- Amos Grunebaum (born 1950), obstetrician and gynecologist
- Gustave E. von Grunebaum, an Austrian arabist
- Michael Grunebaum, an Israeli pediatrician
