= Roven =

Roven is a surname. Notable people with the surname include:

- Charles Roven (born 1949), American film producer
- Glen Roven (1958–2018), American composer, lyricist, conductor, and producer

== See also ==
- René Grillet de Roven, French instrument and watch maker
- Ronen
- Rosen
