= Ronen =

Ronen is a Hebrew surname and given name. Its meaning is cheerful and singing.

== Notable persons with given name Ronen ==
- Ronen Bar, former director of the Israeli Security Agency
- Ronen Bergman, Israeli journalist
- Ronen Rubinstein, American actor

== Notable persons with surname Ronen ==
- Carol Ronen (born 1945), American politician
- Eldad Ronen (born 1976), Israeli sailor
- Eliezer Ronen (1931–2016), Israeli politician
- Hillary Ronen, American politician
- Moshe Ronen, Canadian lawyer and Jewish community leader
- Nehama Ronen (born 1961), Israeli politician
- Omry Ronen (1937–2012), Israeli-American philologist
- Ran Ronen-Pekker (1936–2016), Israeli fighter pilot
- Ravid Ronen (born 2001), Israeli actress and model

== Other uses ==
- Ronen's golden rule for cluster radioactivity formulated by Yigal Ronen, a Professor Emeritus of Nuclear Engineering
