= Dani Buller =

Israeli teacher and TikToker (born 1988)

- דני בולר
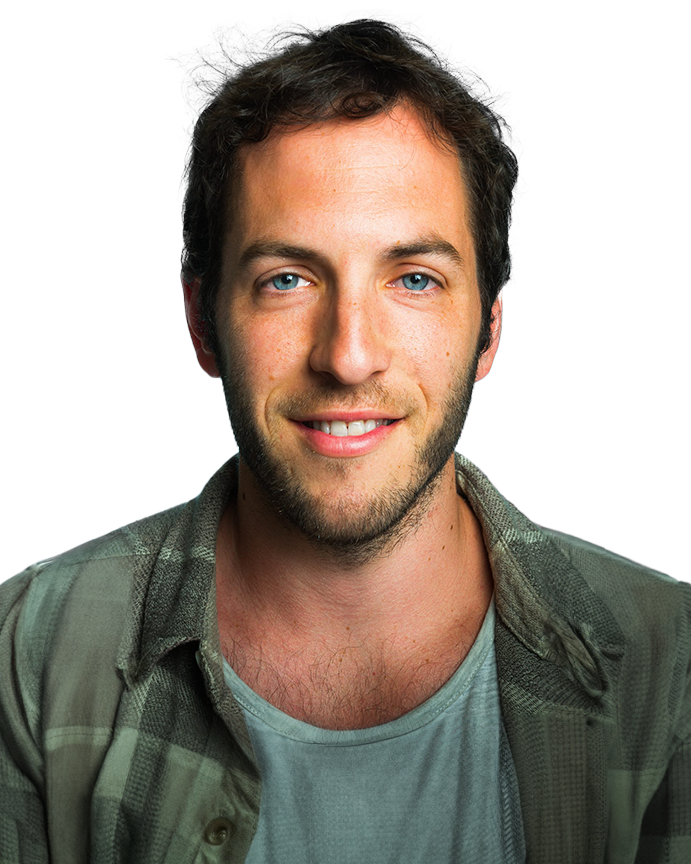
- Dani Buller, 2023
- Born: January 1, 1988 (age 38); Kfar Saba, Israel
- Education: Tel Aviv University
- Occupations: teacher; social media personality
- Years active: 2020-present

Instagram information
- Page: Dani Buller

TikTok information
- Page: Ask Dani

X information
- Handle: @askdani__real
- Display name: Ask Dani

YouTube information
- Channel: Ask Dani
- Website: askdani.co.il

Dan "Dani" Buller (Hebrew: דני בולר; born January 1, 1988), also known as Ask Dani, is an Israeli teacher, high-tech person, internet personality and influencer.

== Biography ==
Buller was born and raised in Kfar Saba and served in the IDF in the Air Force as an officer in the anti-aircraft unit. After 4 1/2 years of military service, he began studying for a bachelor's degree in computer science and economics at Tel Aviv University. In 2017 began working as a full-stack developer at the startup company "Natural Intelligence".

In 2018, Buller successfully completed his studies towards a teaching certificate and began teaching mathematics and later, also creative thinking studies at the Herzliya Gymnasium in Tel Aviv. At first, this was in parallel with his work at the startup, and later, he left the company in favor of teaching full-time.

In 2020, with the outbreak of the coronavirus pandemic in Israel, and after he began giving presentations to his math students, Buller decided to upload some of the presentations to the social network TikTok, after which he also began posting his videos on it, which quickly gained momentum. Over time, Buller began posting content on the channel on a variety of topics such as evolution, religion and science, geology, Israeli politics and more under the name "Ask Dani".

In July 2022, he posted a video announcing the launch of a website, where all content would be uploaded, organized by category. In November 2022, "Srutonim" released a parody video featuring the cartoon character of Dani explaining dirty pun jokes.

=== 2023 ===
After a period of gaining popularity on TikTok, Buller began posting sponsored videos by commercial companies, in addition to his regular videos. He stated that the sponsored videos now serve as his primary income. By March 2023, Buller's channel had amassed 200,000 followers, and on June 18, 2023, he appeared in episode 19 of season 7 of the television game show "The Chase" on Kan 11.

In July 2023, Buller began publishing, together with "Liberal" magazine, a series of videos called "What Are We Talking About", in which he explains the meaning of common concepts in political science.

With the outbreak of the Iron Swords War, he began uploading videos presenting the State of Israel's position in the conflict and participated in Home Front Command videos in which he presents instructions to citizens in emergency situations.

In November 2023, Buller had over 250,000 followers on TikTok and was ranked 19th on the list of "Favorite Israeli TikTokers of 2023" by Mako.

== Personal life ==
Buller is married to Yeela and has a son and a daughter. He lives in Tel Aviv.

== Opinions ==
=== Politics ===
Buller advocates free market policies, reducing regulation and the public sector, and reducing government intervention. He also advocates transparency, the separation of religion from the state and reducing the power of workers' committees. Starting in September 2022, in preparation for the elections for the twenty-fifth Knesset, Buller published a series of videos in which he reviews the platforms of the various parties. In these elections, Buller stated that he himself voted for the Economic Freedom Party led by Abir Kara.

=== Teachers' Union ===
Buler opposes the moves of the Teachers' Union and frequently criticizes the conduct of Yaffe Ben-David, the director general of the union, and has spoken out against the teachers' strike in the summer of 2022 and against the teacher salary model in Israel, whether in the Education Committee of the Israeli Knesset or in interviews with the media. Buller is a member of the board of directors of the Teachers Leading Change Association.

=== Chief Rabbinate ===
Buller expressed his opposition to the monopoly of the Chief Rabbinate of Israel and married in a Jewish wedding without a rabbi on behalf of the rabbinate.
