= Nina Pekerman =

Israeli athlete (born 1977)

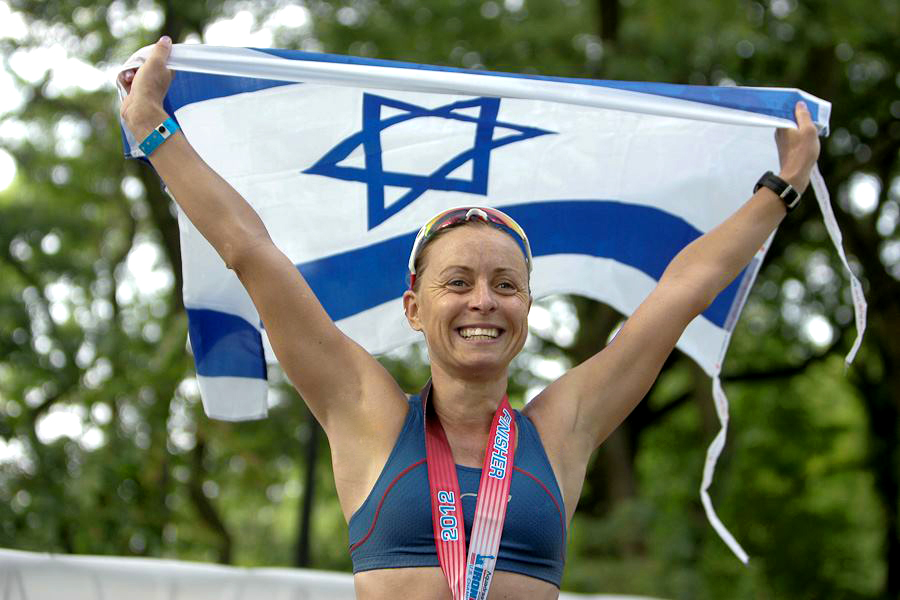
- Nina Pekerman in 2012

Personal information
- Native name: נינה פקרמן
- Nationality: Israeli
- Born: September 28, 1977 (age 48) Chişinău, Moldovan SSR, Soviet Union

Sport
- Sport: Triathlon and Ironman Triathlon
Medal record
Gold medal – first place	2005 Maccabiah Games	Triathlon

Nina Pekerman (Hebrew: נינה פקרמן; born September 28, 1977) is an Israeli athlete who competes in triathlon and Ironman Triathlon competitions. She was rated 25th in the second level of world championship in racing bicycle in 2003, was Israel's champion in Triathlon during the years 2004–2007 and 2009 and was the champion of the Maccabiah Games in 2005, she got to the 10th place and to the 2nd place to her group age in the Ironman Germany in June 2010. In July 2011 she finished 12th in Ironman Europe championship.

== Biography ==
Pekerman was born in Chişinău, Moldovan SSR, Soviet Union as a preterm baby. Her father, Michael, worked as a director of a transportation company and trained in martial arts. Her mother, Raissa, was an athlete and a draftsman in her profession, but worked in a different jobs to raise Nina and her big sister, who were both sick. In order to gain strength, Pekerman trained in sport since her childhood, from 10 till 13–14 years old she was in a swimming club, afterwards she moved to a sport boarding school.

When she was 17 Nina Pekerman immigrated to Israel by herself with NAALE Program (in Hebrew: Teenagers Emigrating Before Parents") of the Jewish Agency for Israel, studied for two years in an agricultural high school in Kfar Silver.

She was recruited into the Israel Defense Forces and served first as a secretary and afterwards went to a Physical fitness combat trainers course, and served most of her mandatory military tenure in that position.

Starting in 1998 Perkerman studied Physical fitness for disable persons) in Wingate Institute. After five years in which she lived alone in Israel, her parents immigrated to Israel. In 2002, she competed for the first time in Triathlon, afterwards she focused on cycling races and in 2003 she competed in the second level of the world championship and finished in 25th place. In 2004 her father died and she returned to Israel to live with her mother, in the same year she was offered a contract with an Italian professional team and she moved back to Italy, but after two weeks she discovered her mother had cancer and she returned once again to Israel.

In 2005, she won the Maccabiah Games in Triathlon. From 2004 to 2007 she was Israel Triathlon champion, in 2008 she did not compete and in 2009 she was again Israel champion in Triathlon.

Starting in 2009, she began training for the Ironman distance. In 2009, she competed in Israman, the Israeli Triathlon championship and was 5th place overall (men and women) and first place among the women. In late May she competed in the half Ironman competition in Jordan Valley, Israel, and set a new Israeli record for women of 4.46 hours.

In the Ironman Germany held in Roth, Germany on July 4, 2010 she got to the women's 10th overall place and second place in her age category (30–34), with a record of 9.47 hours.

On October 9, 2010 she competed in Ironman World Championship held in Hawaii, and she is the second Israeli (after Gilad Rotem) to compete in that tournament.

In the 2010 Ironman World Championship she finished first in her Age group (30–34) with a record of 9:55:19 And third the overall Amateur and 26th out of all the woman (including pros).

In July 2011 she finished 12th in Ironman Europe championship.

In October 2011, in Ironman World Championships in Hawai, she finished in the 20th place (improvement of 6 places of her previous record), with the result of 09:45:35 hours (improvement of 10 minutes of her previous result).

In January 2013, Pekerman finished 1st in the Israeman (Israeli Ironman) in the half distance.

In April 2013 she finished in the 8th place in Ironman South Africa.

In January 2014, Pekerman finished in the 1st place in the Israman Negev (Israeli Ironman). Later that year, In October, she took 12th place in Ironman Barcelona.

In January 2015, she took 2nd place in Israman in Eilat. Later on, in March, she took 16th place in Ironman South Africa. That same year she took 6th place at the Ironman competition in Nice, France.

In 2016, she participated in the Israeli Crossfit Championship and entered the Top 10 Finals field.

In 2017, she won first place in the Israeli Crossfit Championship in the ages 35–39 category.

Pekerman resides in Kfar Saba, Israel, trains swimming to Triathlon, Hydrotherapy and babies activities in the water.
