= Ravid Ronen =

Israeli actress and model

- רביד רונן
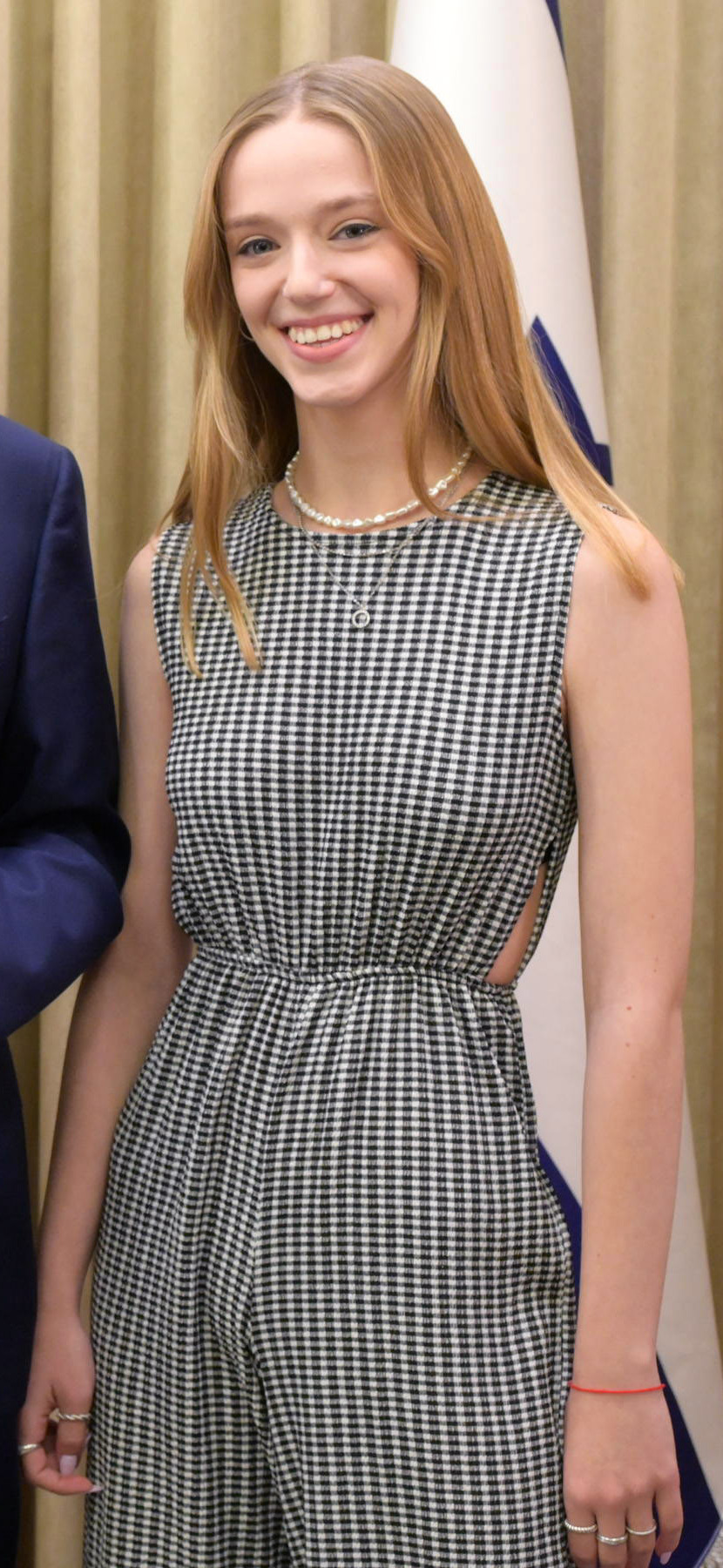
- Ronen in 2022
- Born: December 3, 2001 (age 24); Kfar Saba, Israel
- Occupations: Actress; Model
- Years active: 2014–present

Ravid Ronen (Hebrew: רביד רונן; born 3 December 2001) is an Israeli actress and model.

== Early life ==
Ronen was born on 3 December 2001 in Kfar Saba. She studied acting at the Kfar Saba Youth Theatre and at Katznelson High School, where she graduated in 2020.

She enlisted in the Israel Defense Forces on 1 April 2021 for her mandatory military service, serving at HaKirya in Tel Aviv until her discharge on 31 March 2022.

== Career ==
Ronen was known for her role as Zoe in the television series Elisha from 2014 to 2018.

In 2021, Ronen played Rivka Chaya in Bastora.

She played Yasmin in the 2023 television series Fly on Anna. In 2023 she also starred in the dance film Decisions.
