= Michael Grunebaum =

American psychiatrist

Michael F. Grunebaum is an American psychiatrist. He graduated from Harvard College for his bachelor's degree (1983) and Harvard Medical School for his medical degree (1991). He has worked at the New York State Psychiatric Institute and in private practice in Manhattan. He is also an associate professor of psychiatry at Columbia University Medical School. His research is in the area of mood disorders and suicidal behavior. Several of his research papers are highly cited according to Google Scholar.

== Education and career ==
Grunebaum graduated magna cum laude from Harvard College in 1983 and earned his medical degree from Harvard Medical School in 1991. He completed his psychiatric residency at the Payne Whitney Psychiatric Clinic of the New York Hospital-Cornell Medical Center in 1995, followed by a Public Psychiatry Fellowship at Columbia University. In addition to his institutional research and teaching roles, he maintains a private psychiatric practice in Manhattan.

== Research ==
Grunebaum's research primarily focuses on the clinical and biological factors influencing major depressive disorder, bipolar depression, and suicide risk. Funded by grants from the National Institute of Mental Health (NIMH), his work includes investigating rapid-acting pharmacological interventions for treatment-resistant depression.

He is particularly known for leading clinical trials assessing the efficacy of subanesthetic ketamine infusions to rapidly reduce acute suicidal ideation compared to active controls like midazolam.
