= List of people from Columbus, Ohio =

The following list includes notable people who were born or have lived in Columbus, Ohio, in alphabetical order by last name.

== Actors ==
- Chet Allen (1939–1984), television, Amahl and the Night Visitors on Hallmark Hall of Fame; Bonino; member of the Columbus Boychoir
- Lexi Allen (1967– ), gospel singer and television personality; born in Columbus and a prominent figure in The Word Network
- Majel Barrett (1932–2008), television (Star Trek, Star Trek: The Next Generation); born in Columbus
- Warner Baxter (1889–1951), film (In Old Arizona); born in Columbus and lived there until age nine
- Richard Biggs (1960–2004), actor; born in Columbus
- Andrea Bowen (1990– ), actress; born in Columbus
- Lawrence Edward Carter, Jr. (1941– ), historian, professor, author, and civil rights expert; founding dean of the Martin Luther King Jr. International Chapel at Morehouse
- Grace Cunard (1893–1967), actress, screenwriter, and film director; born in Columbus
- Beverly D'Angelo (1951– ), film (National Lampoon's Vacation series); born and raised in Columbus
- Mike Faist (1992– ), film (Challengers); born and raised in Columbus
- Alana de la Garza (1976– ), television (Law & Order); born in Columbus
- Dody Goodman (1915–2008), television (Mary Hartman, Mary Hartman); born in Columbus
- Eileen Heckart (1919–2001), actress; born in Columbus
- Elsie Janis (1889–1956), vaudeville performer, screenwriter, actress and composer; born in Columbus and maintained a home there
- A.J. Langer (1974– ), television (My So-Called Life); born in Columbus and lived there until age five
- Andrew Levitt (1979– ), actor; also known as Nina West- born in Greentown, resident of Columbus, RuPaul's Drag Race season 11 star
- Lorissa McComas (1970–2009), actress and glamour model; born in Columbus
- Marnie McPhail (1966– ), actress and musician; born in Columbus
- Tom Poston (1921–2007), television (Newhart); husband of Suzanne Pleshette; born in Columbus
- Josh Radnor (1974– ), television (How I Met Your Mother); born in Columbus
- Gigi Rice (1965– ), television (The John Larroquette Show); born in Columbus
- Gene Sheldon (1908–1982), television (Disney's Zorro); born in Columbus
- J. K. Simmons, (1955- ), television, film, and voice actor; moved to Columbus as a child; attended Worthington High School
- Cory Michael Smith, actor, best known for his role as Edward Nigma (Riddler) in the Fox television drama series Gotham
- Julia Swayne Gordon (1878–1933), actress; born in Columbus
- Philip Michael Thomas (1949– ), actor; born in Columbus
- Kenan Thompson (1978– ), actor; born in Columbus
- Hal Williams (1938–2026), actor; born in Columbus

== Artists ==
- Benny Alba (1949– ), artist; born in Columbus
- George Bellows (1882–1925), realist painter, known for bold depictions of urban life in New York City, becoming, according to Columbus Museum of Art, "the most acclaimed American artist of his generation"
- Charles Csuri (1922–2022), father of digital art and computer animation
- Ray Evans (1887–1954), political cartoonist
- Natalia Fedner (1983– ), fashion designer, raised in Columbus, Ohio
- Shawn Foster (1973– ), music video, film and television director
- Alex Grey (1953– ), psychedelic artist; born in Columbus and attended Columbus College of Art and Design
- Janet Cook Lewis (1855–1947), painter, librarian and bookbinder
- Jammes Luckett (1974– ), musician, writer, visual artist, and voice actor; born in Columbus
- Todd Douglas Miller, filmmaker
- OsamaSon (2003– ), underground rapper and producer associated with the rage/experimental hip-hop scene
- Elijah Pierce (1892-1984), wood carver whose art career began in Columbus
- Christopher Ries (1952– ), sculptor; born in Columbus and attended the Ohio State University
- Aminah Robinson (1940–2015), artist; born in Columbus
- Alice Schille (1869–1955), watercolorist and painter
- Chris Sprouse (1966– ), comic book artist
- T. S. Sullivant (1854–1926), cartoonist and illustrator
- Ted Williams (1958– ), voiceover artist who became an overnight celebrity when his YouTube video went viral in January 2011

=== Architects ===
- Nathan Kelley (1808–1871)
- Frank Packard (1866–1923)
- Howard Dwight Smith (1886–1958), architect of, most notably, Ohio Stadium; graduated from the Ohio State University in 1907

== Athletes ==
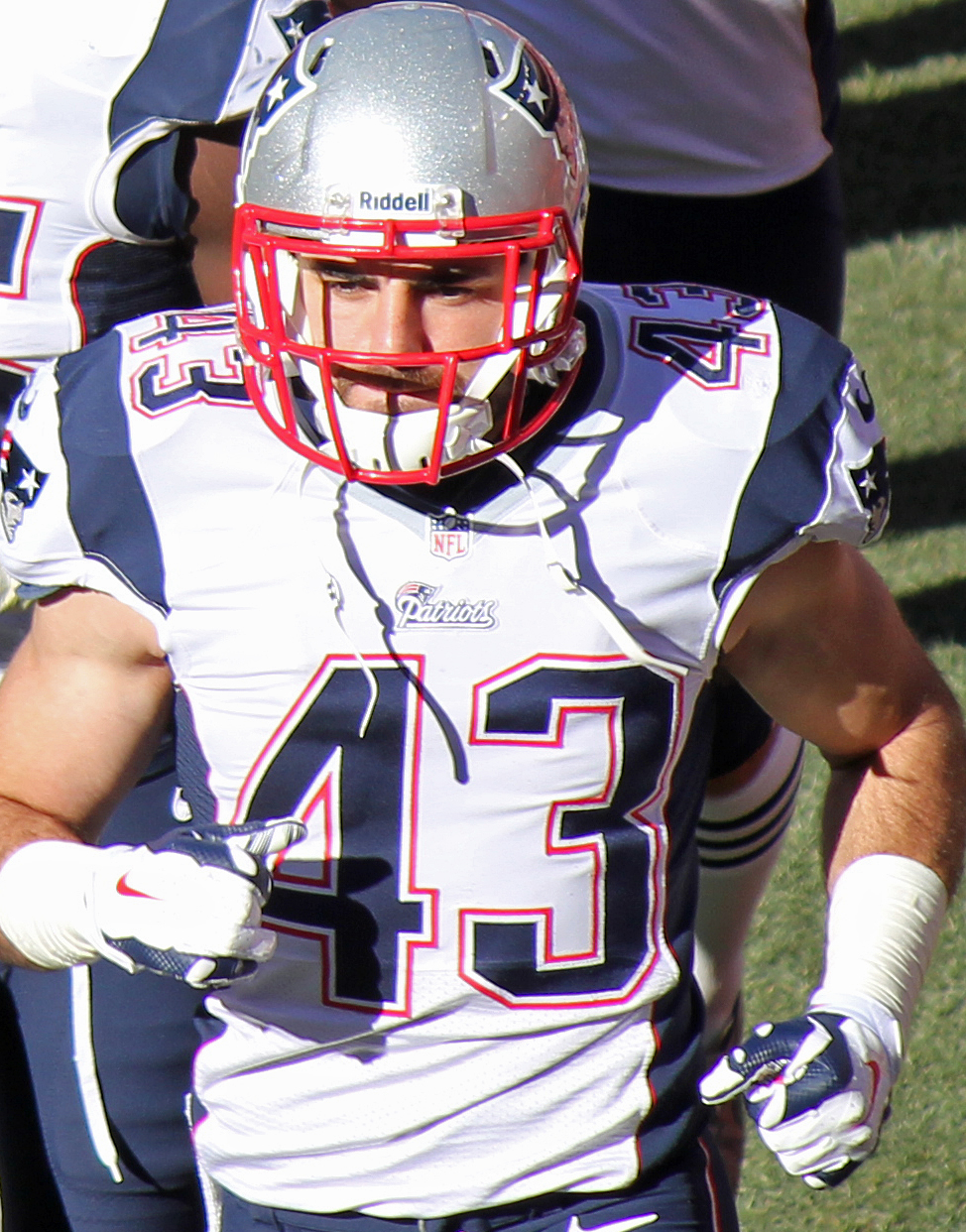
Nate Ebner

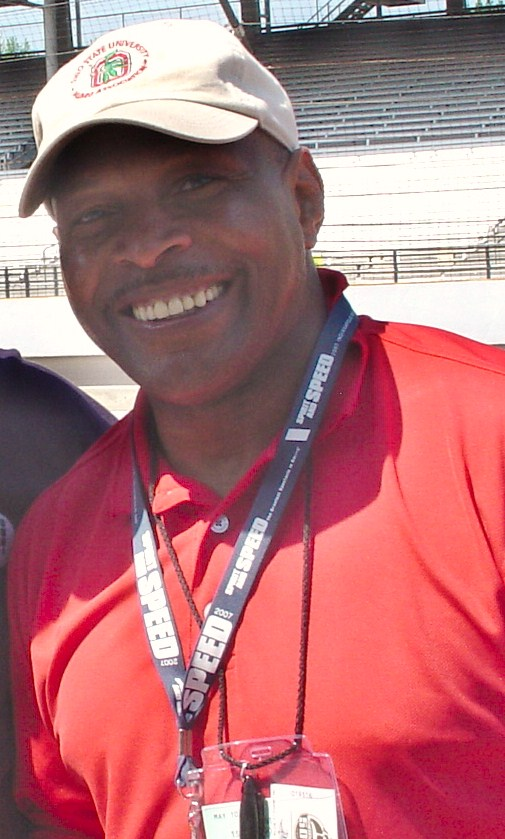
Archie Griffin

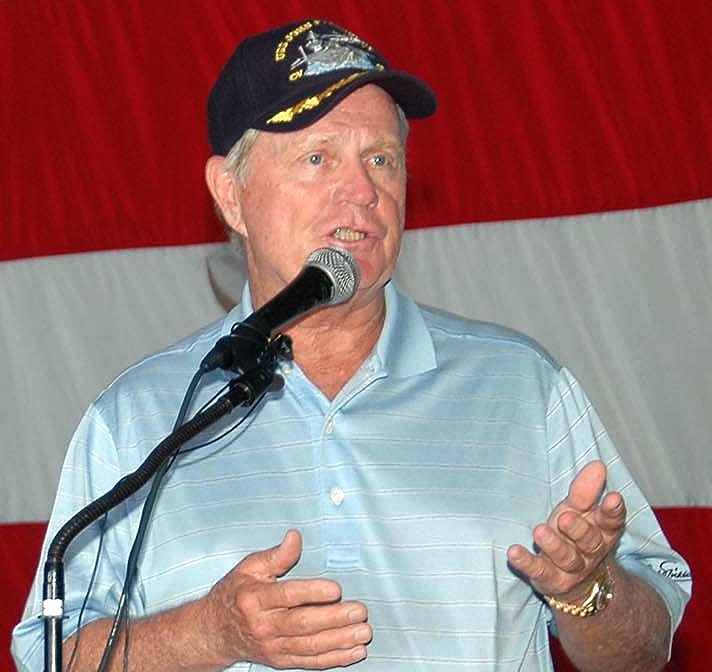
Jack Nicklaus

- Miller Anderson (1922–1965), diver; born in Columbus
- Chad Barson (1991– ), soccer player
- Simone Biles Owens (1997– ), gymnast, three-time world all-around champion, 2016 Olympian, won four gold medals; born in Columbus
- Jake Blankenship (1994– ), professional pole vaulter; raised in Columbus; attended Gahanna Lincoln High School
- Alexa Bliss (1991– ), professional wrestler; born and raised in Columbus
- Lisa Bonder (1965– ), tennis player; born in Columbus
- Pat Borders (1963– ), Major League Baseball player; born in Columbus
- Malaki Branham (2003– ), basketball player; born in Columbus
- Mike Brown (1970– ), basketball coach; born in Columbus
- Trey Burke (1992– ), NBA guard, plays for the Houston Rockets; born in Columbus
- Russ Campbell (1969– ), NFL tight end for the Pittsburgh Steelers; born in Columbus
- Howard Cassady (1934–2019), NFL running back and Heisman Trophy winner; born in Columbus; played football and baseball for Ohio State
- Austin Cindric (1998– ), NASCAR driver
- Casey Close (1963– ), baseball player
- Mark Coleman (1964– ), professional fighter from the UFC and Pride mixed-martial-arts organizations; member of Columbus-based Team Hammer House
- Zach Collaros (1988– ), Canadian Football League quarterback for the Hamilton Tiger-Cats
- Carl Cooke (1889–1971), sprinter; born in Columbus
- Joe Cooper (1979– ), professional football player
- Ben Curtis (1977– ), professional golfer, winner of 2003 British Open; born in Columbus
- Antonio Daniels (1975– ), basketball player; born in Columbus
- Helen Darling (1978– ), WNBA guard; attended high school in Columbus
- Jessica Davenport (born 1985), basketball player
- Buster Douglas (1960– ), heavyweight boxing champion after defeating Mike Tyson; born and raised in Columbus
- Nate Ebner (1988– ), football player in the National Football League; rugby Olympian; lived in Columbus as a youth
- Johnny Edwards (1938– ), Major League Baseball player
- Pat Elflein (1994– ), NFL player, born and raised in Columbus and graduated from The Ohio State University
- Sarah Fisher (1980– ), auto racer, drove in nine Indianapolis 500s; born in Columbus
- John Frank (1962– ), NFL football player
- Ross Friedman (1992– ), Harvard and Major League Soccer player
- Lawrence Funderburke (1970– ), Ohio State and NBA basketball player; born and raised in Columbus
- Wally Gerber (1891–1951), Major League Baseball player
- Reggie Gilliam (1997– ), NFL player
- Terry Glenn (1974–2017), Ohio State University and NFL wide receiver; born and raised in Columbus
- Hank Gowdy (1889–1966), Major League Baseball catcher; born and lived in Columbus
- Brian Grant (1972– ), basketball player
- Archie Griffin (1954– ), only two-time Heisman Trophy winner; attended Eastmoor High School, then the Ohio State University; won the Heisman Trophy twice as a running back for the OSU Buckeyes; returned to Columbus after his pro career to become the university's assistant athletic director, and president of its alumni association
- Forrest Griffin (1979– ), UFC light-heavyweight fighter and winner of the first season of The Ultimate Fighter; born in Columbus
- Andrew Hampsten (1963– ), professional cyclist; born in Columbus
- Sam Hanks (1914–1994), race car driver; born in Columbus
- Chic Harley (1894–1974), Ohio State University All-American football player
- Frank Howard (1936–2023), Major League Baseball player; born in Columbus
- Collin Johns (1993– ), professional pickleball player
- Jack Keller (1911–1978), Olympic hurdler
- Bo Lamar (1951– ), basketball player
- Chris Leitch (1979– ), Major League Soccer defender; born in Columbus
- Caris LeVert (1994– ), basketball player
- Pauline Martin, All-American Girls Professional Baseball League player (1946 season)
- Mike Matheny (1970– ), Major League Baseball player; born in Columbus
- Liam McCullough (1997– ), NFL long snapper for the Atlanta Falcons; born in Columbus
- Lance Moore (1983– ), NFL wide receiver for the New Orleans Saints; born in Columbus
- Leroy Morney (1909–1979), Negro League Baseball player
- Jack Nicklaus (1940– ), pro golfer, winner of a record 18 golf majors and member of World Golf Hall of Fame; born in Columbus and attended the Ohio State University; won the 1961 NCAA Championship while playing for the school
- Roosevelt Nix (1992– ), NFL fullback for the Pittsburgh Steelers; born and raised in Columbus; attended high school in Reynoldsburgh and played college football at Kent State
- Abuchi Obinwa (1997– ), professional soccer midfielder; born in Columbus and plays for Columbus Crew SC
- Paul O'Neill (1963– ), Major League Baseball outfielder; born and raised in Columbus
- Danny O'Rourke (1983– ), Major League Soccer midfielder; born and raised in Columbus
- Lilia Osterloh (1978– ), tennis player
- Jesse Owens (1913–1980), track and field; set three world records in one day while in college at the Ohio State University; won four gold medals at the 1936 Olympics; raised in Cleveland, and attended college in Columbus
- Jerry Page (1961– ), boxer; born in Columbus
- Alexis Peterson (1995– ), basketball combo guard; born in Columbus
- Brady Quinn (1984– ), NFL quarterback; born in Columbus and attended high school in Dublin, Ohio
- Madison Rayne (1986– ), professional wrestler for TNA Impact and All Elite Wrestling
- Michael Redd (1979– ), Ohio State University basketball player and NBA shooting guard; born and raised in Columbus
- Ed Rile (1900–1971), Negro League Baseball player
- Dave Roberts (1944–2009), Major League Baseball pitcher; moved to Columbus
- Joe Roberts (1936–2022), NBA assistant coach; born in Columbus
- Mauri Rose (1906–81), auto racer
- Jack Roslovic (1997– ), NHL player, Edmonton Oilers
- Emmanuel Sabbi (1997– ), soccer player
- Randy Savage (1952–2011), professional wrestler, former WWE champion; born in Columbus
- Devon Scott (born 1994), basketball player in the Israel Basketball Premier League
- Kip Selbach (1872–1956), Major League Baseball outfielder; born in Columbus
- Kiefer Sherwood (1995– ), NHL player
- Kole Sherwood (1997– ), NHL player
- Cole Sillinger (2003– ), NHL player, Columbus Blue Jackets; born in Columbus
- George Simpson (1908–1961), sprinter; born in Columbus
- Lee Snoots (1892–1968), American Professional Football Association (pre-NFL) player
- David Špaček (2003– ), NHL player
- Spencer Strider (1998– ), MLB player, starting pitcher for the Atlanta Braves; born in Columbus
- Jared Sullinger (1992– ), CBA forward for the Shenzhen Leopards; born in Columbus and played for Ohio State
- Nick Swisher (1980– ), Major League Baseball outfielder; attended the Ohio State University
- Thelma Thall (1924– ), two-time world table tennis champion
- Wil Trapp (1993– ), Major League Soccer midfielder; plays for Minnesota United FC and grew up in Gahanna
- Gary Trent (1974– ), NBA player; attended Hamilton Township High School and was born and raised in Columbus
- Louie Vito (1988– ), professional snowboarder, 2010 US Olympic Team, four-time Overall US Grand Prix Champion and two-time Dew Cup Overall Champion; six career X Games medals, including two gold medals; born in Columbus
- Granville Waiters (1961–2021), NBA player; born and raised in Columbus
- Samaki Walker (1976– ), NBA player; born and raised in Columbus
- Evan White (1996– ), Major League Baseball player; born in Columbus
- Herb Williams (1958– ), NBA player and coach; born in Columbus and played basketball for the Ohio State University
- Jarren Williams (1997– ), NFL defensive back for New York Giants; born and raised in Columbus
- John Williamson (1986– ), basketball player for Hapoel Tel Aviv B.C. of the Israeli Basketball Premier League
- Bill Willis (1921–2007), NFL player
- Blaine Wilson (1974– ), gymnast, Olympic silver medalist in 2004; attended the Ohio State University

== Diplomats ==
- James Linn Rodgers (1861–1930), United States Consul General to Shanghai, Havana and Montreal (also editor of Columbus Dispatch)

== Entrepreneurs ==
- Jeni Britton Bauer (1973– ), founder of Jeni's Splendid Ice Creams
- Dick Cepek (1930–1983), Off-road Motorsports Hall of Fame member, parts supplier and racer; raised in Columbus
- Gregory Franks (1958– ), wealth management executive at Snowden Lane Partners
- Jack Hanna (1947– ), zookeeper and television personality; director of the Columbus Zoo and Aquarium (1978–1993), director emeritus afterwards
- John H. McConnell (1923–2008), founder of Worthington Industries and the Columbus Blue Jackets NHL team
- Jay Schottenstein (1954– ), entrepreneur and philanthropist
- Dave Thomas (1932–2002), founder of Wendy's restaurant chain, whose first store was in Columbus
- Robert D. Walter (1944– ), founder of Cardinal Health, born and raised in Columbus
- Leslie Wexner (1937– ), founder and chairman emeritus of L Brands
- Granville Woods (1856–1910), inventor; spent his early childhood in Columbus

== Journalists ==
- Charlotte Curtis (1928–1987), reporter and editor for the Columbus Citizen and the New York Times
- Wil Haygood (1954– ), Pulitzer-nominated, award-winning journalist Washington Post; wrote the article that inspired the movie The Butler
- Charles F. Hockett (1916–2000), linguist; born in Columbus
- Terry Murphy, television journalist, Chicago and Los Angeles news anchor, host of shows Hard Copy and Extra; born in Columbus
- Sacha Pfeiffer (1971– ), award-winning journalist with the Boston Globe
- Cabot Rea, Emmy Award-winning television reporter and anchor for the Columbus NBC affiliate WCMH; anchored the local UPN news at WWHO
- Cora Rigby, first woman at a major paper to head a Washington News bureau; one of the founders of the Women's National Press Club
- James Linn Rodgers (1861–1930), editor of Columbus Dispatch (also United States Consul General to Shanghai, Havana and Montreal)
- Dana Tyler, news anchor at WBNS
- Ralph Waldo Tyler (1860–1921), journalist and war correspondent during World War I
- Andrew Welsh-Huggins, journalist and author of the Andy Hayes mystery novels, set in Columbus

== Military personnel ==
- Casper H. Conrad Jr. (1872–1954), U.S. Army brigadier general
- Cordelia E Cook (1919–1996), World War II U.S. Army first lieutenant in the United States Army Nurse Corps
- Donald G. Dunn (1923–2021), World War II decorated member of the 10th Mountain Division
- Donn Eisele (1930–1987), NASA astronaut; colonel, U.S. Air Force
- Linda L. Fagan (1963– ), first female commandant of the Coast Guard
- Stanley H. Ford (1877–1961), United States Army general
- Gilbert C. Hoover (1894–1980), World War I and World War II USN admiral, involved in developing the nuclear bomb
- Curtis LeMay (1906–1990), World War II and Cold War U.S. Air Force general; born and raised in Columbus; studied civil engineering at the Ohio State University
- Irvin McDowell (1818–1885), army officer; born in Columbus
- Perry L. Miles (1873–1961), U.S. Army brigadier general
- Charles Wright Miner (1840–1928), US Army brigadier general
- William H. Nash (1834–1902), US Army brigadier general, retired in Columbus
- Eddie Rickenbacker (1890–1973), World War I fighter pilot, "Ace of Aces"; born and raised in Columbus
- Willard Franklyn Searle (1924–2009), captain, U.S. Navy Supervisor of Salvage 1964–1969; born and raised in Columbus
- Richard Secord (1932– ), Air Force major general
- Walter Cowen Short (1870–1952), US Army brigadier general
- Paul Tibbets (1915–2007), World War II Enola Gay decorated pilot

== Miss America ==
- Mary Katherine Campbell (1905–1990), Miss America 1922; born and raised in Columbus and attended the Ohio State University
- Laurie Lea Schaefer, Miss America 1972

== Musicians ==
- Caamp, American Folk band
- Sanguisugabogg, death metal band
- Art Ryerson, guitarist
- əkoostik hookah, musical group
- Attack Attack!, metalcore band
- Beartooth, hardcore punk band
- Blueprint, rapper and hip hop producer
- Bizzy Bone (1976– ), rapper, part of Bone Thugs-n-Harmony
- Bow Wow (1987– ) (formerly known as "Lil' Bow Wow"), rapper; born in Columbus and spent his early childhood there
- Brakence (2001– ), singer-songwriter
- Happy Chichester, singer-songwriter
- Colin Rigsby, singer-songwriter Vesperteen, also drummer for House of Heroes
- Copywrite, underground hip-hop artist
- The Crimson Armada, metalcore band
- Jay DeMarcus (1971– ), bassist in the country group Rascal Flatts; born and raised in Columbus
- Rocco Di Pietro (1949– ), composer
- Aaron Diehl (1985– ), jazz pianist
- Jerome Dillon (1969– ), drummer and musician, formerly of Nine Inch Nails
- Josh Dun (1988– ), drummer of rock duo Twenty One Pilots
- Early Man, speed metal band
- Harold "Sweets" Edison (1915–1999), jazz trumpeter of the swing/bebop era who played and recorded with Coleman Hawkins, Ben Webster, and Count Basie; born in Columbus and attended East High School
- FanFan (范玮琪) (1976– ), Taiwanese-American artist; born in Columbus
- Fly Union, musical group
- Michael Feinstein (1956– ), singer; born in Columbus and lived there until age 19
- Terry Glaze, original lead singer of heavy metal band Pantera
- Stomp Gordon, jump blues pianist and singer
- House of Heroes, Christian rock band
- Howard Jones (1970– ), lead vocalist of Light the Torch
- Illogic (1980–), rapper and hip-hop artist(formerly Devil You Know), former lead vocalist of Killswitch Engage and Blood Has Been Shed
- Jawhar Glass (born January 18, 1980), rapper and hip-hop artist(formerly Devil You Know), former lead vocalist of Killswitch Engage and Blood Has Been Shed
- Tyler Joseph (1988– ), lead vocalist of rock duo Twenty One Pilots
- Like Moths to Flames, metalcore band.
- Jawhar Glass (born January 18, 1980), rapper and hip-hop artist(formerly Devil You Know), former lead vocalist of Killswitch Engage and Blood Has Been Shed
- Rahsaan Roland Kirk (1935–1977), jazz saxophonist; born and raised in Columbus, and educated at the Ohio State School for the Blind
- Latto (1998– ), rapper; born in Columbus
- Gary LeVox (1970– ), lead singer of country group Rascal Flatts
- Joe "Foley" McCreary, bass player for Miles Davis
- Nancy Jewel McDonie singer, who became famous with the Korean KPop group Momoland
- My Ticket Home, alternative metal band
- O.A.R., roots rock band
- Phil Ochs (1940–1976), folk-activist singer and songwriter; grew up in Columbus, which provided the inspiration for his song "Boy in Ohio"; studied journalism at Ohio State University
- Don Patterson (1936–1988), jazz organist
- Penny & The Quarters, short-lived 1970s soul band that came to notice in 2011
- Conrad Reeder (1954– ), singer/songwriter
- Red Wanting Blue, alternative rock band
- John Reuben (1979– ), Christian rapper
- RJD2 (1976– ), real name Ramble Jon "RJ" Krohn; hip-hop producer
- Saving Jane, alternative rock band
- Starset, alternative rock band
- Caleb Shomo (1992– ), lead vocalist of Beartooth, former lead vocalist/keyboardist of Attack Attack!
- Jermaine Stewart, R&B singer; born in Columbus
- The Sun, alternative rock band
- Camu Tao (1977–2008), rapper and producer, member of S.A. Smash
- Times New Viking, indie rock band
- Twenty One Pilots, alternative rock music duo from Columbus
- Joe Walsh (1947– ), musician, solo artist, guitarist for The Eagles
- Nancy Wilson (1937–2018), singer
- Dwight Yoakam (1956– ), country singer; raised in Columbus and briefly attended Ohio State

== Politicians ==
- Joyce Beatty (1950–), U.S. representative for Ohio (2013–), minority leader of the Ohio House of Representatives (2006–2009, Ohio state representative (1999–2008)
- Prescott Bush (1895–1972), U.S. senator elected from Connecticut, father and grandfather of Presidents George H. W. Bush and George W. Bush, respectively; born in Columbus and spent his childhood there until 1908; moved back to Columbus for part of 1923 for a job in business
- Mike Carey (1971–), U.S. representative
- Ben Clarke (1928–2026), member of the Colorado House of Representatives
- Patrick Clifford, member of the Wisconsin State Assembly, born in Columbus
- Richard Cordray, 1st director of the Consumer Financial Protection Bureau, born in Columbus
- Bob Hackett, Ohio State senator
- Mark Kersey, member of the San Diego City Council, born in Columbus
- Milton Latham (1827–1882), politician, governor of California, U.S. representative and U.S. senator; born in Columbus
- Pat McCrory (1956– ), 74th governor of North Carolina (2013–2017), longest-serving mayor of Charlotte, North Carolina; born in Columbus, but relocated to North Carolina as a child; 2008 Republican nominee for governor of North Carolina
- Carol Miller (1950– ), U.S. representative for West Virginia
- Burgess Owens (1951– ), football player and U.S. representative for Utah
- Harley Rouda (1961– ), attorney, businessman and politician, U.S. representative for California's 48th congressional district; born in Columbus
- Bob Shamansky (1927–2011), politician and attorney, member of the U.S. House of Representatives from Ohio's 12th district; born in Columbus

== Writers ==
- Hanif Abdurraqib (1983– ), poet and author; raised in Columbus
- David Auburn (1970– ), playwright; raised in Columbus
- Lois McMaster Bujold (1949– ), science fiction author; born in Columbus
- Ron Burch, TV writer and producer, screenwriter, playwright and novelist; born and raised in Columbus and attended the Ohio State University
- Charlotte Curtis (1928–1987), first female editor of the New York Times, born in Columbus and worked at the Columbus Citizen for 11 years
- Natalie Dee, webcomic artist; creator of Natalie Dee; co-creator of Married to the Sea with husband Drew; lives in Columbus
- Drew (1979– ), webcomic artist, creator of toothpaste for dinner and co-creator of Married to the Sea; lives in Columbus
- Florence Magruder Gilmore (1881–1945), author and settlement worker
- Fred Golan (1959– ), television writer and executive producer; raised in Columbus, studied at Ohio State
- Margaret Peterson Haddix (1964– ), author; lives in Columbus
- Saeed Jones, writer and poet
- Kristen Lepionka, crime fiction writer
- Harvey C. Mansfield, Jr. (1932– ), professor of Government at Harvard University; author of numerous books on the subject of political theory; graduated from high school in Columbus
- Lida Rose McCabe (1865–1938), author, journalist, lecturer
- Tom Meek (1965– ), columnist; lived in Columbus in 1976
- Ming Peiffer (1988– ), playwright; grew up in Columbus
- Mary Robison (1949– ), short story writer
- Arthur M. Schlesinger, Jr. (1917–2007), historian and writer; born in Columbus
- Jeff Smith (1960– ), cartoonist and creator of Bone; grew up and currently lives in Columbus
- Maggie Smith, poet, freelance writer, and editor, born in Columbus
- Donald Ogden Stewart (1894–1980), humorist, playwright, and Academy Award-winning black-listed screenwriter; born and raised in Columbus
- R. L. Stine (1943– ), author; born and raised in Columbus; attended the Ohio State University
- James Thurber (1894–1961), cartoonist and humorist; born and raised in Columbus; many of his short stories depict episodes from this period of his life
- Allyssa Wolf (born 1971), poet

== Other ==
- Ted Allen (1968– ), author and television personality, Queer Eye, Chopped; born in Columbus
- Joshua Angrist, economist; born in Columbus
- Roman Atwood (1983– ), Youtube personality, comedian, vlogger from Columbus
- Neal Buckon (1953– ), prelate of the Roman Catholic Church; born in Columbus
- Neil Carpathios (1961– ), poet, professor, newspaper columnist, radio program host
- Annie W. Clark (1843–1907), president, Ohio Woman's Christian Temperance Union
- Michael G. Davis (1959– ), television weather presenter and convicted sex offender
- Mark Dindal (1960– ), effects animator and director, Cats Don't Dance, The Emperor's New Groove; born and raised in Columbus
- Chris Douridas (1962– ), radio host, actor, music supervisor
- Guy Fieri (1968– ), chef on Food Network, born in Columbus
- Judah Folkman (1933–2008), medical scientist who founded the field of angiogenesis research; raised in Columbus, and graduated from the Ohio State University
- Michael Foreman (1957– ), astronaut; born in Columbus
- Mark Frissora, CEO of Caesars Entertainment
- Ray Dempsey Gardner (1922–1951), serial killer
- Lincoln Goodale (1782–1868), doctor and namesake of Goodale Park
- David E. Harris, first African-American commercial airline pilot and pilot captain for a major U.S. commercial airline
- Sandra Hubby (1978– ), Playboy Playmate and beauty pageant contestant; represented Columbus in the Miss Hawaiian Tropic Pageant
- Bill Keller (1958– ), televangelist
- Curtis Lovell II (1981– ), illusionist, escape artist and endurance artist
- Jeffrey L. Meikle (1949– ), cultural historian, professor
- Ruth Ella Moore (1903–1994), academician, bacteriologist, microbiologist, and fashion designer, born in Columbus, awarded a Ph.D. of historical note in 1933 by Ohio State University, professor and department chair at Howard University
- Alexis Nikole Nelson (1992– ), forager and internet celebrity
- Nathaniel Peterson popularly known as Coyote Peterson (1981-), a YouTuber, animal adventurer and explorer
- Brian Redban (1974–), co-host of Kill Tony and original producer of The Joe Rogan Experience, as well as other popular comedy podcasts.
- J. Havens Richards (1851–1923), Jesuit and president of Georgetown University
- Galen Starr Ross (1895–1980), academic and college president
- Ann Shaw (1921–2015), civic leader, social worker
- Randy Skinner (1952– ), Broadway director and choreographer; born and raised in Columbus; graduated from the Ohio State University in 1974

== See also ==
- Mayors of Columbus, Ohio
- People associated with Capital University
- People associated with the Ohio State University
