= Cathedral of Our Lady of Guadalupe (Ensenada) =

Cathedral in Ensenada, Mexico

- Catedral de Nuestra Señora de Guadalupe
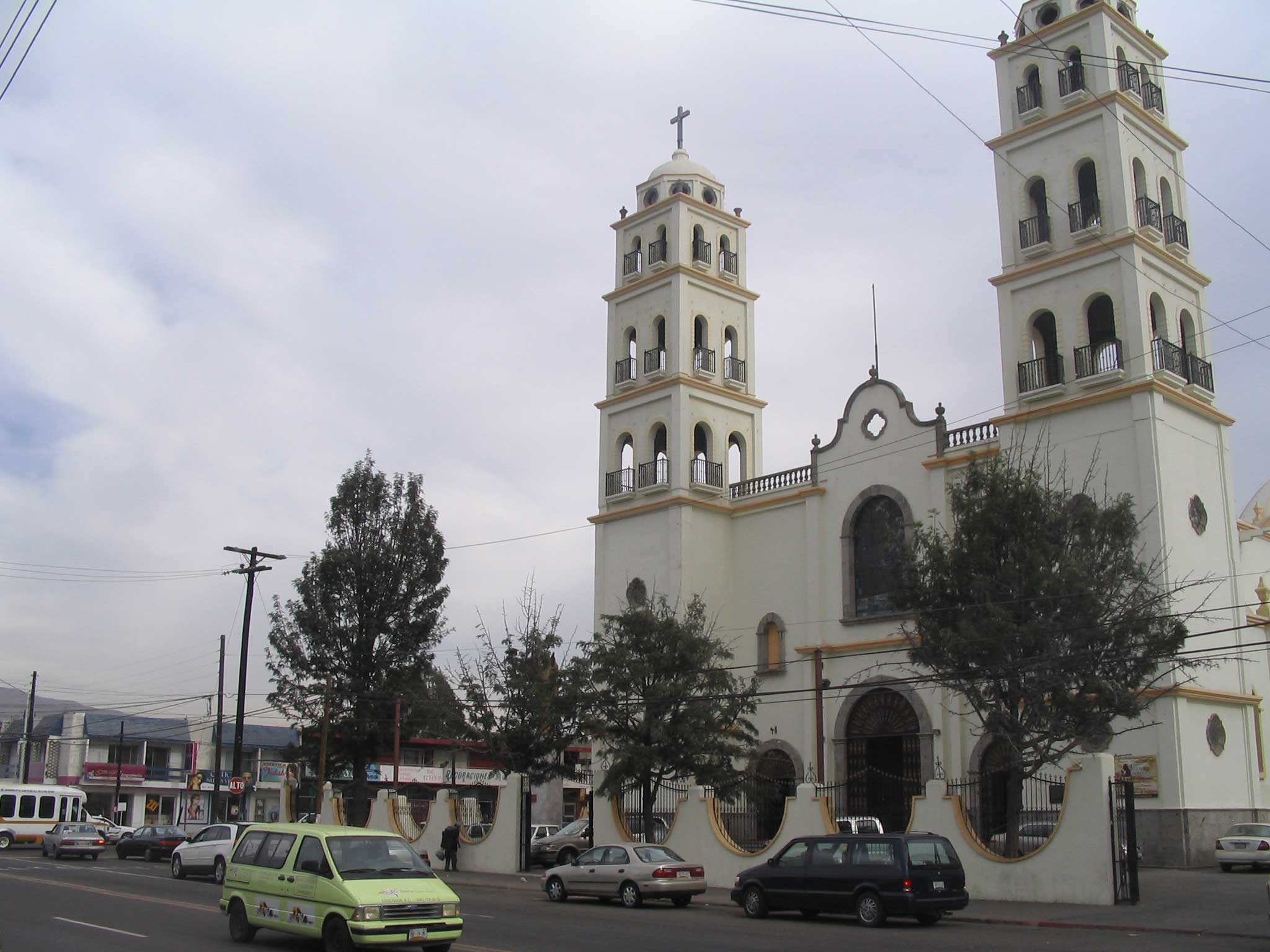
- Facade in 2015

- 31.8642°N 116.6141°W
- Location: Ensenada, Baja California
- Address: Av. Floresta #565 Col. Obrera, entre Sexta y Juarez 22830 Ensenada, Península de Baja California, México
- Country: Mexico
- Language(s): Spanish, English
- Denomination: Catholic
- Religious institute: Franciscan
- Website: www.diocesisensenada.org

History
- Status: Cathedral
- Founded: June 12, 1951
- Founder(s): Fr. Carlos Martinez; Fr. Guadalupe Parra; Fr. Nicolás J. Tinney
- Dedication: Our Lady of Guadalupe
- Dedicated: September 12, 1987
- Consecrated: September 12, 1987

Architecture
- Functional status: Active
- Architect(s): Fr. Felipe de Jesús López; Carlos Macfarland
- Architectural type: Spanish Colonial
- Years built: 1951-1984
- Groundbreaking: June 12, 1951
- Completed: October 1984
- Construction cost: $34,000 (equivalent to $906,755,395 in 2025)

Specifications
- Height: 36.5 m (120 ft)

Administration
- Archdiocese: Tijuana
- Diocese: Ensenada

Clergy
- Archbishop: Francisco Moreno Barrón
- Bishop: Rafael Valdéz Torres

The Cathedral of Our Lady of Guadalupe (Spanish: Catedral de Nuestra Señora de Guadalupe) is a Catholic church in Ensenada, Baja California, serving as the headquarters of the Diocese of Ensenada since 2007. It was built from 1951 to 1984, in the Spanish Colonial style, and dedicated to Our Lady of Guadalupe.

== History ==
In the 1940s, Msgr. Felipe Torres Hurtado, the head of the Apostolic Administration of Baja California, wanted to bring more people of the Franciscan order into Ensenada to improve the culture and religion of the area. The first Franciscans in Ensenada, Fr. Carlos Martinez, Fr. Guadalupe Parra, and Fr. Nicolás J. Tinney (an American) arrived in the city on December 2, 1947. They had the idea of building a sanctuary for Our Lady of Guadalupe and started to build one on June 12, 1951, when they placed the first stone under the supervision of Bishop Alfredo Galindo Mendoza. They had previously bought this land, formerly on the outskirts of the city, from the Rudametkin family. Funds were first raised in 1948. On October 18, Fr. Felipe de Jesús López took over construction. The cathedral's engineer was Carlos Macfarland. The side of the nave facing Av. Juarez was the first to be built and was used for worship while other parts of the church were being built. The other side of the nave, facing St. Sexta was built and then converted into a movie theater to raise money for construction. However, they were unable to raise enough money in time, so they had to build the Guadalupan Hall to project 16 mm films. Fr. Felipe stepped down from his position as supervisor to work on other projects in September 1959. The church was nearly complete at this time.

Construction continued, with three priests, Fr. Fernando Cisneros, Fr. Nicolás Pérez, and Fr. Benjamín Orozco, working on much of the interior, adding black marble pieces, the altar and altarpiece, stained glass windows, and baptismal font. The sanctuary became a parish on December 12, 1967. Fr. Felipe returned to the church on August 11, 1981, to finish the towers. Electronic bells were installed on the tops of the towers, which were finished in October 1984. The towers were blessed by Cardinal Sebastiano Baggio, accompanied by Archbishop Girolamo Prigione and Bishop Emilio Carlos Berlie Belaunzarán on November 9, 1984. The church was consecrated as a Sanctuary dedicated to Our Lady of Guadalupe on September 12, 1987.

The Diocese of Ensenada was split from the Archdiocese of Tijuana in 2007, resulting in the Sanctuary's status being elevated into a Cathedral in a celebration taking place on May 23. Bishop Sigifredo Noriega Barceló was the head of the diocese during this time and was replaced by Bishop Rafael Valdéz Torres in 2013. In 2011, some of Pope John Paul II's relics, including a capsule of his blood, visited the cathedral as a part of a tour throughout Mexico.

== Architecture and features ==
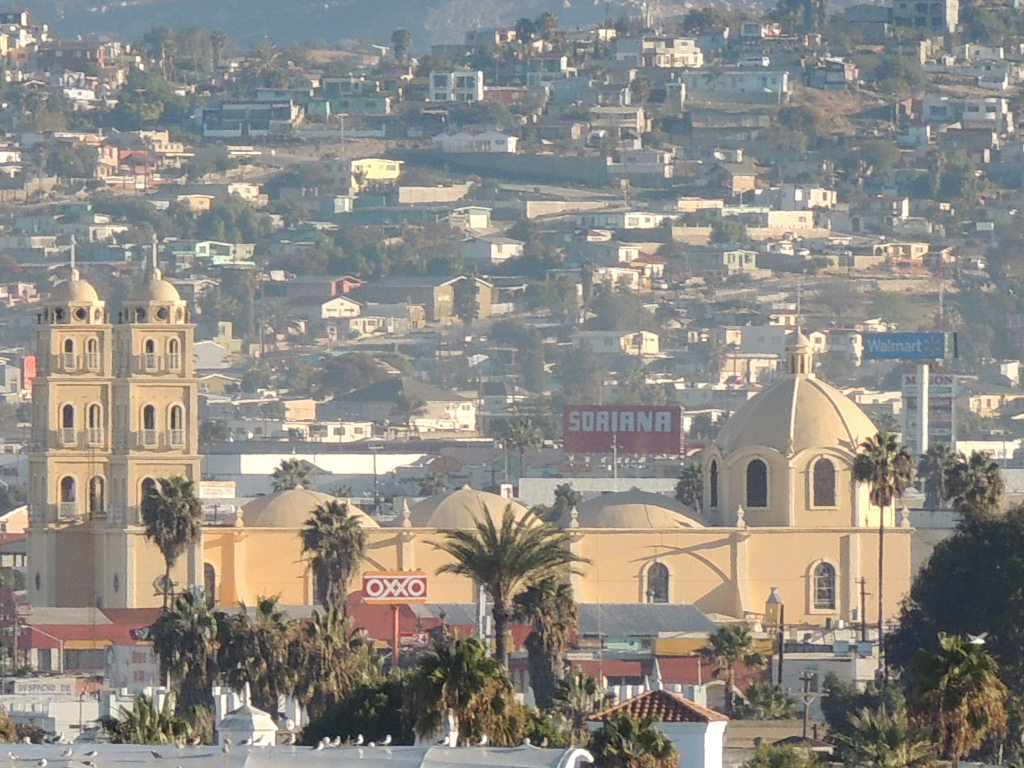
Side in 2013

In 1957, Fr. Felipe commissioned a statue of Christ the King to place on one of the cathedral's domes. It was cast in Vaucouleurs in France, shipped to Los Angeles, and brought by land to Ensenada. The statue was eventually placed on one of the sides of the Sanctuary instead as the dome would not have supported its weight. José Lizaola made five paintings of Our Lady of Guadalupe for the church, taking inspiration from the Nican Mopohua.
