= Alba (surname) =

- Pronunciation: [ˈalβa]

Origin
- Meaning: It has various disputed meanings; the coincidence in form with Latin alba (feminine) (‘white’) is suggestive.
- Region of origin: Spain

Alba is a Spanish surname. Notable people with the surname include:

- Benny Alba (born 1949), American artist
- Elia Alba (born 1962), Dominican-American visual artist
- Enrique Alba (born 1968), Spanish computer scientist
- Gibson Alba (born 1960), Dominican Republic baseball player
- Jessica Alba (born 1981), American actress
- Jordi Alba (born 1989), Spanish footballer
- Julia Alba (born 1972), Spanish sprinter
- Luis Larrea Alba (1895–1980), President of Ecuador in 1931
- Macrino d'Alba (c. 1460–c. 1510), Italian painter
- Maria Alba (1910–1999), artistic name of Spanish-American film actress
- Miguel Alba (born 1988), Argentine footballer
- Miguel Ángel Alba Díaz (1951–2026), Mexican Roman Catholic bishop
- Panchito Alba (1925–1995), artistic name of a Filipino film actor
- R. D. Alba (born 1978), Filipino film and television director
- Richard Alba (1942–2025), American sociologist
- Rogaciano Alba, Mexican farmer
- Samuel Alba (born 1947), American judge
- Sara Alba (born 1968), Spanish politician
- Unai Alba (born 1978), Spanish footballer
- Víctor Alba (1916–2003), Spanish politician, journalist, writer and university professor
- Karl "Dyzee" Alba (born 1979), Canadian born Filipino, world champion professional B-Boy (break dancer)

== See also ==
- House of Alba, an important aristocratic family of Spanish origin
- Duke of Alba, Spanish nobility of the House of Alba
