= Rafael Romo Muñoz =

Mexican Catholic bishop (born 1940)

The Most Reverend Rafael Romo Muñoz
- Archbishop Emeritus of Tijuana
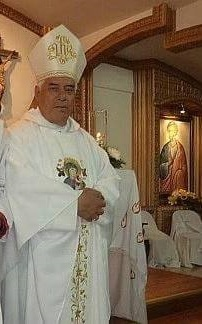
- Church: Catholic Church
- Archdiocese: Tijuana
- Installed: 1996
- Term ended: 2016
- Predecessor: Emilio Carlos Berlie Belaunzarán
- Successor: Francisco Moreno Barrón

Orders
- Ordination: November 28, 1965 by Fernando Romo Gutiérrez
- Consecration: February 24, 1996 by Girolamo Prigione

Personal details
- Born: November 22, 1940 (age 85) Torreón
- Education: Pontifical Gregorian University (Sacred theology); Pontifical Alphonsian Academy (Moral theology)
- Alma mater: Pontifical Gregorian University

Rafael Romo Muñoz (born November 22, 1940) is a Mexican Catholic prelate. He is archbishop emeritus of Tijuana, having served from 1996 to 2006 as bishop and from 2006 to 2016 as the first archbishop of the newly raised metropolitan archdiocese.

== Biography ==
Romo Muñoz was born in Torreón, in the state of Coahuila. After completing his elementary education, he entered the seminary of Saltillo in 1953. In 1958, he moved to the Mexican Seminary of Montezuma, New Mexico, where he studied philosophy.

From 1961 to 1962, he returned to his hometown and helped establish the local seminary. He later went to Rome, where he studied at the Pontifical Gregorian University during the Second Vatican Council, earning a licentiate in Dogmatic Theology.

He was ordained a priest on November 28, 1965, in Rome. He then serve as a parish vicar and later became spiritual director of the Torreón seminary. He subsequently returned to Rome for advanced studies at the Alphonsian Academy, completing a program in Moral Theology and beginning his doctoral studies. After returning to Mexico, he was appointed rector of the diocesan seminary, a position he held for 17 years.

In 1993, he became president of the Organization of Mexican Seminaries and also participated in the corresponding Latin American organization. In 1995, he was appointed spiritual director of the Pontifical Mexican College in Rome.

On January 13, 1996, he was appointed bishop of Tijuana by Pope John Paul II. He was consecrated on February 24 by the apostolic nuncio Girolamo Prigione, with Emilio Carlos Berlie Belaunzarán and Luis Morales Reyes acting as co-consecrators.

On November 25, 2006, Pope Benedict XVI elevated the diocese to a metropolitan archdiocese and confirmed him as its first archbishop. He received the pallium on June 29, 2007, at St. Peter's Basilica.

He also held positions within the Episcopal Conference of Mexico, particularly in the pastoral care of migrants, and served on its council from 2015 to 2016.

In 2014, a local newspaper reported accusations that he had been aware of allegations of sexual abuse involving priests in his archdiocese and had allowed them to remain in ministry.

Upon reaching the age of 75, he submitted his resignation, as required by canon law. It was accepted by Pope Francis on November 16, 2016. He remained as apostolic administrator until his successor took office.

== See also ==
- Archdiocese of Tijuana
- Diocese of Torreón
- Catholic Church in Mexico
