= Eric Hacker (para-athlete) =

American para-athlete

Personal information
- Full name: Eric Nathaniel Hacker
- Nationality: American
- Born: 2001 (age 24–25) Columbus, Ohio, U.S.

Sport
- Sport: Track and Field
- Disability: Cerebral palsy
- Disability class: T38
- Events: Middle-distance, Long-distance
- Club: Fleet Feet Columbus Track Club
- Team: Shawnee State Bears
Medal record
Gold medal – first place	2019 Adaptive Sports USA Junior Nationals	1500 m T38
Gold medal – first place	2019 Adaptive Sports USA Junior Nationals	3000 m T38
Gold medal – first place	2026 Hartford Nationals by Move United	1500 m T38
Bronze medal – third place	2026 Toyota USATF Para National Championships	1500 m T38
Silver medal – second place	2019 OHSAA Division II Boys Cross Country	Team
Gold medal – first place	Mid-Ohio Conference	Conference Championship
Silver medal – second place	Mid-Ohio Conference	Conference Championship
	2019 OHSAA Indoor Track State Championships	4×800 m relay

Eric Nathaniel Hacker (born c. 2001) is an American middle- and long-distance runner from Ohio who competes in para-athletics in the T38 classification. He is a multiple national-level medalist and record holder in junior para-athletics events, and a graduate of Shawnee State University.

== Early life and education ==
Hacker was born in Columbus, Ohio, and raised in Chillicothe, Ohio. Diagnosed with cerebral palsy as an infant, he wore leg braces during early childhood while undergoing physical therapy. The Chillicothe Gazette described him as “one of the top runners in the area” despite the physical challenges of CP.

He began competitive running in junior high and qualified six times for state-level championships.

Hacker graduated from Unioto High School in 2020, where he was a member of the National Honor Society and an honor-roll student. He later attended Shawnee State University, earning President's List recognition for academic excellence in 2022.

== High school career ==
At Unioto High School, Hacker qualified 14 times for the OHSAA State Championships in cross-country and track and won multiple conference titles.

In 2019, he helped lead Unioto to a runner-up team finish at the OHSAA Division II State Cross Country Championships.

He was also a multiple-time Academic All-Ohio honoree and recipient of the 2020 Archie Griffin Award recognizing athletic and academic excellence.

== Para athletics and national competition ==
Hacker competes in the T38 para-athletics classification. At the 2019 Adaptive Sports USA Junior Nationals, he won national titles in the 1500 m and 3000 m T38 events, both setting national records in his classification. His 1500 m performance (4:29.0) is listed as an American record by Adaptive Track & Field USA.

He is a 13-time national qualifier, two-time All-American, and two-time Junior National Champion. Hacker qualified for the U.S. Paralympic Trials and competed on the pathway toward the Tokyo Paralympic Games.

== Collegiate career ==
Hacker competed for Shawnee State University in cross-country and distance track events. He completed his collegiate running and academic career with the Bears.

== Recognition ==
In 2019, the Ohio House of Representatives adopted House Resolution 225 honoring Hacker for his national titles at the Adaptive Sports USA Junior Nationals.

His athletic achievements and advocacy for adaptive sports have been profiled in national and regional media, including Runner’s World and the USA TODAY Network.

== Personal life ==
Hacker resides in Columbus, Ohio, and continues to train and compete in distance running and para-athletics.

== Major championships and personal bests ==
- 2019 Adaptive Sports USA Junior Nationals — U20/T38 1500 m: 4:28.99 (1st)
- ATFUSA junior T38 record (1500 m — 4:29.0; 2019)
- High-school personal bests (outdoor): 800 m — 2:10.21; 1600 m — 4:41.15; 3200 m — 9:55.43

== See also ==
- Ohio High School Athletic Association
