= Braulio Rafael León Villegas =

Mexican Roman Catholic prelate (1943–2024)

Most Reverend Braulio Rafael León Villegas
- Bishop Emeritus of Ciudad Guzmán
- Church: Roman Catholic Church
- Appointed: 11 December 1999
- Retired: 25 September 2017
- Predecessor: Serafín Vásquez Elizalde
- Successor: Óscar Armando Campos Contreras
- Previous post: Bishop of La Paz en la Baja California Sur (1990–1999)

Orders
- Ordination: 17 May 1970 (Priest) by Pope Paul VI
- Consecration: 29 March 1990 (Bishop) by Girolamo Prigione

Personal details
- Born: Braulio Rafael León Villegas; 26 March 1943 León, Guanajuato, Mexico
- Died: 30 December 2024 (aged 81) Ciudad Guzmán, Jalisco, Mexico

Braulio Rafael León Villegas (26 March 1943 – 30 December 2024) was a Mexican Roman Catholic prelate.

== Biography ==
León Villegas after graduating studies at the Diocesan Seminary of León, subsequently studied the Dogmatic Theology and Canon Law at the Pontifical Gregorian University in Rome, Italy, since 1967. He was ordained priest on 17 May 1970 by Pope Paul VI at the Piazza San Pietro. After his return from the studies, he worked in the various positions in his native Diocese of León in Mexico since 1972 until 1990.

Pope John Paul II appointed him on 21 February 1990 as the third Bishop of La Paz en la Baja California Sur. The Apostolic Delegate in Mexico, Archbishop Girolamo Prigione, consecrated him on 29 March of the same year in the Cathedral of La Paz.

On 11 December 1999, León Villegas was transferred as a Diocesan Bishop of the Diocese of Ciudad Guzmán, where he served until his retirement on 25 September 2017, because of the age limit.

León Villegas died in Ciudad Guzmán on 30 December 2024, after the two-years struggle against liver cancer. He was 81.

Catholic Church titles
Preceded by Serafín Vásquez Elizalde	Bishop of Ciudad Guzmán; 1999–2017	Succeeded by Óscar Armando Campos Contreras
Preceded by Gilberto Valbuena Sánchez	Bishop of La Paz en la Baja California Sur; 1990–1999	Succeeded by Miguel Ángel Alba Díaz
