= Chapel of the Christ, San Pablo del Monte =

Former chapel in Tlaxcala, Mexico

Chapel of the Christ Capilla del Cristo (Spanish)
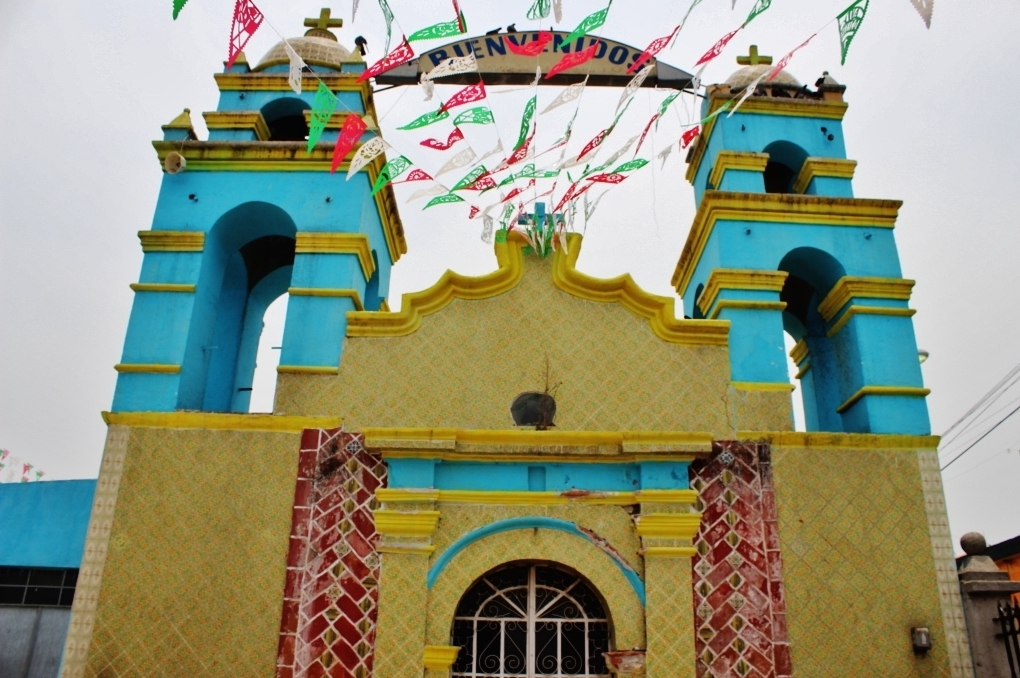
- The chapel in 2013 (two years before its demolition)

Religion
- Affiliation: Roman Catholic Church
- Diocese: Diocese of Tlaxcala
- Status: Demolished

Location
- Location: Xicohtencatl, San Pablo del Monte, Tlaxcala
- Interactive map of Chapel of the Christ; Capilla del Cristo (Spanish)
- Coordinates: 19.130005°N 98.158891°W

Architecture
- Type: Chapel
- Style: Neoclassical
- Groundbreaking: 18th century
- Completed: 18th century

The Chapel of the Christ (Spanish: Capilla del Cristo) was a Roman Catholic chapel located in San Pablo del Monte, Tlaxcala (formerly Villa Vincente Guerrero), which was built in the 18th century. It was demolished the night of July 25, 2015, by order of the barrio (neighborhood) where the chapel was located. Despite having been declared a Historical Landmark of Tlaxcala by the INAH (Instituto Nacional de Antropología e Historia), it would still be demolished, which meant violating one of the historic landmark protection laws.

It was demolished to give a better view of the current Chapel of Christ the King, which was on one side with a view forward, which covered the old Chapel.

== Destruction ==
The destruction of the Chapel of the Christ was carried out according to the first investigations with heavy machinery on July 25 and 26, 2015; and the fact was publicly denounced by the authorities of the Instituto Nacional de Antropología e Historia on July 28, describing it as a "barbaric act" and demanding the punishment of those responsible.

On July 28 the Bishop of Tlaxcala, Francisco Moreno Barrón, distanced himself from the destruction, assuring that the parish priest had no knowledge of the event. The investigations of the complaint were initially carried out by the Tlaxcala authorities, however the Attorney General's Office announced on the 29th that it was attracting the complaint of the destruction because it was a federal crime.

Although initially it was considered that the chapel had been destroyed by unknown persons, the first investigations indicate that those responsible would be the so-called "majordomos" of the neighborhood—traditional authorities in charge of organizing public worship and patronal festival—who would have made the decision before the alleged deterioration of the chapel, which, according to statements by the residents, had been repeatedly denounced without the authorities doing anything to restore the building; considering therefore that it was a collective decision, supported by the majority of the inhabitants of the neighborhood.
