= Miguel Ángel Alba Díaz =

Mexican Roman Catholic bishop (1951–2026)

His Excellency Miguel Ángel Alba Díaz
- Bishop Emeritus of La Paz, Baja California Sur
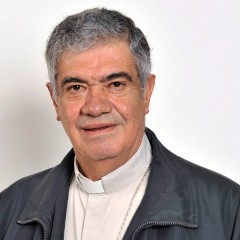
- Archdiocese: Tijuana
- Diocese: La Paz, Baja California Sur
- Appointed: June 16, 2001
- Term ended: January 31, 2026
- Predecessor: Braulio Rafael León Villegas
- Successor: Miguel Ángel Espinoza Garza
- Previous posts: Auxiliary Bishop of Antequera and Titular Bishop of Fesseë (1995–2001)

Orders
- Ordination: May 31, 1975
- Consecration: July 25, 1995 by Adolfo Suárez Rivera, Héctor González Martínez and Sergio Obeso Rivera

Personal details
- Born: January 23, 1951 Monterrey, Nuevo León, Mexico
- Died: February 2, 2026 (aged 75) La Paz, Baja California Sur, Mexico

Miguel Ángel Alba Díaz (Note: In this Hispanic American name, the first or paternal surname is Alba and the second or maternal family name is Díaz.) (January 23, 1951 – February 2, 2026) was a Mexican Roman Catholic prelate who was the bishop of the Diocese of La Paz, Baja California Sur.

== Biography ==
Alba Díaz was born in Monterrey, Nuevo León, on January 23, 1951. He studied humanities, philosophy and theology in the seminary of his native city. He was then ordained a priest in Monterrey on May 31, 1975. He was appointed titular bishop of Fessei and auxiliary bishop for the Archdiocese of Oaxaca by Pope John Paul II on June 10, 1995, and consecrated on July 25, in a ceremony presided over by Archbishop Adolfo Suárez Rivera.

Pope John Paul II appointed him the third bishop of the Diocese of La Paz, Baja California Sur, on July 16, 2001, and he took possession the same year.

Alba Díaz retired on January 31, 2026, and died in La Paz, Baja California Sur, on February 2, 2026, at the age of 75, three days after his retirement.

Catholic Church titles
Preceded by Braulio Rafael León Villegas	Bishop of La Paz, Baja California Sur; 2001–2026	Next: Sede vacante
Preceded by Patrick Dunn	Titular Bishop of Fesseë; 1995–2001	Next: Héctor Cubillos Peña
Preceded by —	Auxiliary Bishop of Antequera; 1995–2001	Next: —
