= Diocese of La Paz en la Baja California Sur =

Roman Catholic diocese in Mexico

Coordinates: 24.1617°N 110.3130°W

Diocese of La Paz en la Baja California Sur Dioecesis Paciensis in California Inferiori Meridionali Diócesis de La Paz en la Baja California Sur
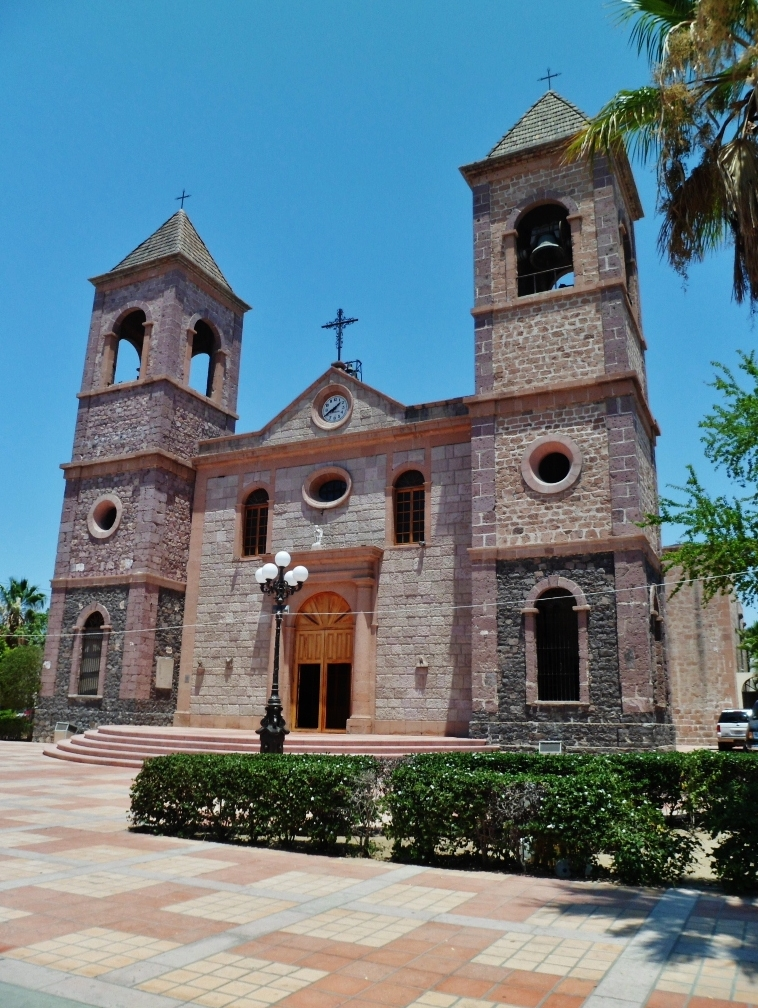
- Catedral de Nuestra Señora de la Paz

Location
- Country: Mexico
- Territory: State of Baja California Sur.
- Ecclesiastical province: Archdiocese of Tijuana
- Metropolitan: La Paz, Baja California Sur

Statistics
- Area: 28,457 sq mi (73,700 km^{2})
- Population: Total; Catholics: (as of 2004); 512,170; 512.200 (95.7%)
- Parishes: 42

Information
- Denomination: Roman Catholic
- Rite: Roman Rite
- Established: March 21, 1988
- Cathedral: Cathedral of Our Lady of The Peace

Current leadership
- Pope: Leo XIV
- Bishop: Miguel Ángel Espinoza Garza

Map

Website
- diocesislapaz.org

The Roman Catholic Diocese of La Paz en la Baja California Sur (Latin: Dioecesis Paciensis in California Inferiori Meridionali) (erected 21 March 1988) is a suffragan diocese of the Archdiocese of Tijuana. It was a suffragan of the Archdiocese of Hermosillo until 25 November 2006.

Between 1874 and 1939 La Paz was the seat of the apostolic vicariate of Baja California (later it became the current Diocese of Tijuana).

La Paz was the seat of the apostolic prefecture of La Paz, erected in 1957, promoted to apostolic vicariate in 1976 and to diocese in 1988.

== Ordinaries ==
Apostolic Vicariate of Baja California in La Paz

- Ramón María de San José Moreno y Castañeda, O. Carm. (1873–1879). appointed Bishop of Chiapas (Ciudad Real de Chiapas)
- Buenaventura del Purísimo Corazón de María Portillo y Tejeda, O.F.M. (1880–1882), appointed Bishop of Chilapa, Guerrero
  - (vacant 1882-1921)
- Silvino Ramírez y Cuera (1921–1922)
  - (vacant 1922-1939)
  - (see relocated to Ensenada, later to Tijuana, see Diocese of Tijuana)

Prefecture Apostolic of La Paz en la Baja California Sur

- Juan Giordani, F.S.C.J. (1958 -1972 )
- Gilberto Valbuena Sánchez (1972 -1976 see below)

Vicariate Apostolic of La Paz en la Baja California Sur

- Gilberto Valbuena Sánchez (see above 1976 -1988 see below)

Diocese of La Paz en la Baja California Sur

- Gilberto Valbuena Sánchez (see above 1988 -1989), appointed Bishop of Colima
- Braulio Rafael León Villegas (1990 -1999), appointed Bishop of Ciudad Guzmán, Jalisco
- Miguel Ángel Alba Díaz (2001 - 2026)
- Miguel Ángel Espinoza Garza (since 2026)

== Episcopal See ==
- La Paz, Baja California Sur

== External links and references ==
- "Diocese of La Paz en la Baja California Sur". Catholic-Hierarchy.
- Diócesis de La Paz Official Page.
- Mexico Conference of Catholic Bishops. La Paz Page
