= Shawnee State University =

Public university in Portsmouth, Ohio, US

- Type: Public university
- Established: 1986; 40 years ago
- Parent institution: University System of Ohio
- Endowment: $24.8 million (2024)
- President: Eric A. Braun
- Students: 3,257 (fall 2023)
- Undergraduates: 3,033
- Postgraduates: 224
- Location: Portsmouth, Ohio, United States; 38°43′53″N 82°59′36″W
- Campus: 62 acres (250,000 m^{2})
- Colors: Navy Blue & Gray
- Nickname: Bears
- Sporting affiliations: NCAA Division II - MEC
- Website: www.shawnee.edu

Shawnee State University (SSU) is a public university in Portsmouth, Ohio, United States, established in 1986. It is the southernmost member of the University System of Ohio, and is a member of the Strategic Ohio Council for Higher Education (SOCHE).

== History ==
Although its roots date back to 1945 when Ohio University established an academic center in Portsmouth, the university was conceived in 1985 when Vern Riffe, the speaker of the Ohio House of Representatives, introduced legislation to create Shawnee State University. It passed in 1986.

In 1987, the university's library was named a federal depository library.

The university awarded its first bachelor's degrees in 1990. The university established its first master's degree program in 2000 and its second master's program (the Master of Education) in 2010. It now offers several graduate-level degrees.

In 2022, the university was involved in a court case and settled with a professor after he had previously been disciplined for refusing to use a transgender student's preferred pronouns and later sued the university in 2018 over First and Fourteenth Amendment violations.

== Campus ==
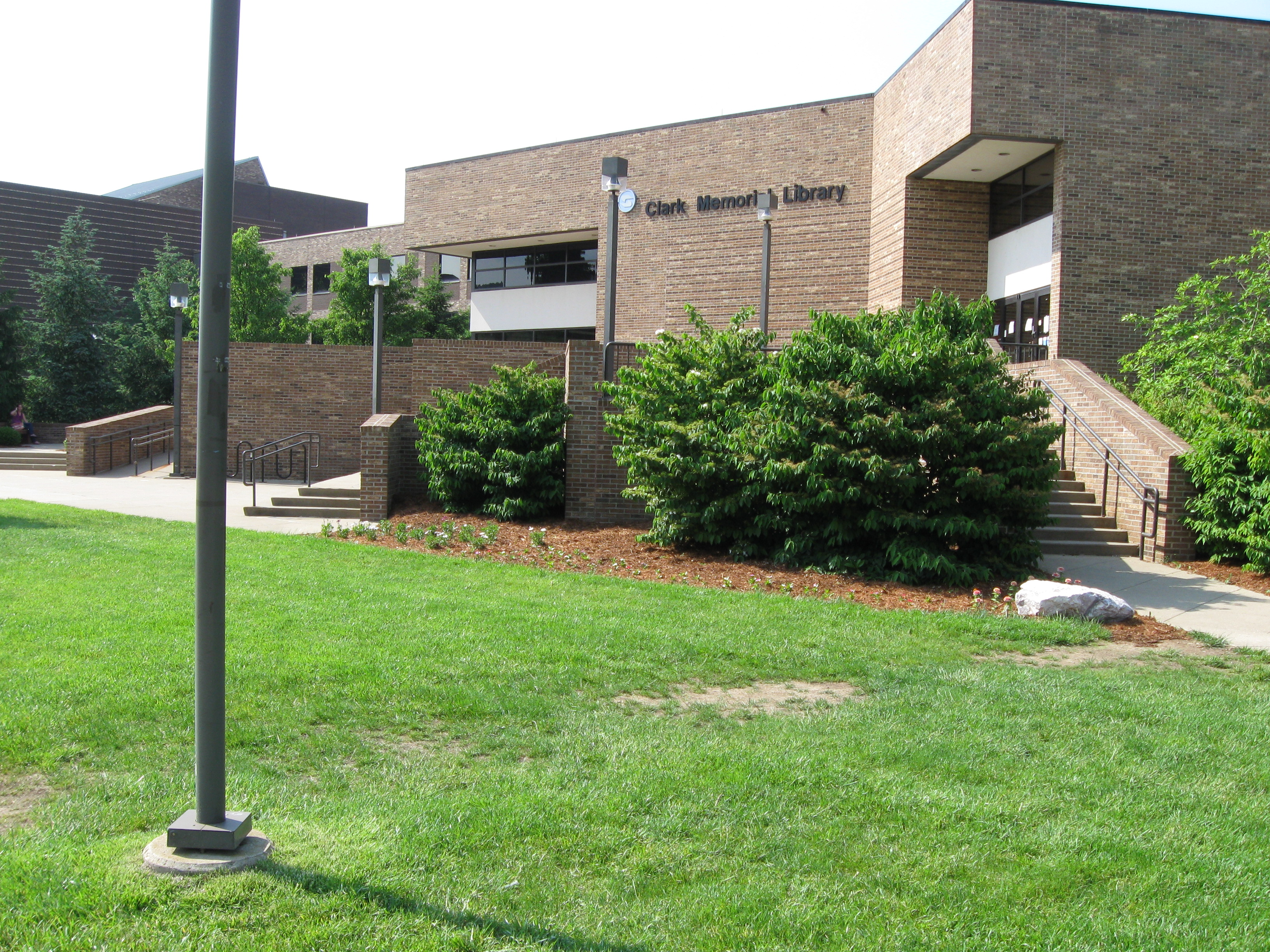
Clark Memorial Library

Shawnee State, located in downtown Portsmouth, has a 62-acre campus. Its 28 buildings include the Vern Riffe Center for the Arts, Clark Planetarium, Morris University Center, and James A. Rhodes Athletic Center. The university's library is the Clark Memorial Library.

Shawnee State University's Mr. and Mrs. Clyde W. Clark Planetarium opened in 1998. The Planetarium permanently displays the Hubble Space Telescope Viewspace system.

== Academics ==
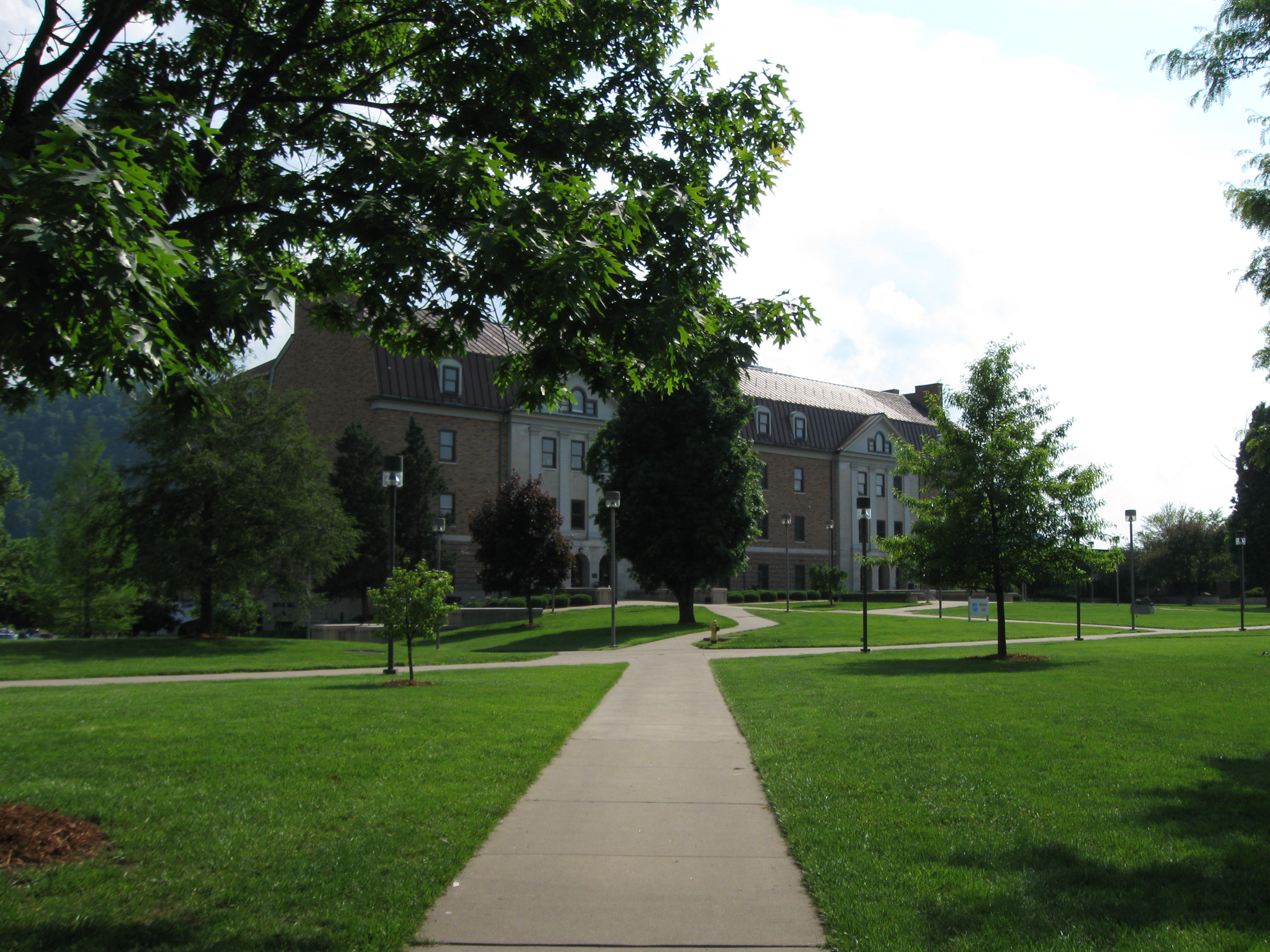
Massie Hall, looking southwest

It is an open admissions university. Shawnee State University has more than 70 associate, bachelor, and master's degree programs. The most popular majors are health and medical administrative services; biology; nursing; animation, interactive technology, video graphics, and special effects; and social sciences.

The university offers an Honors Program for exceptional students. The Clark Memorial Library of Shawnee State is a charter member of the OhioLINK library consortium, giving faculty and students access to 46 million books and other items.

=== Financial aid ===
Shawnee State marketing materials note that more than $25 million is awarded annually in financial aid; annual expenditures as of 2022 list approximately $11 million as federal direct loans which must be repaid by borrowers. Approximately $6.3 million in scholarships and fellowships were paid out over the same period. Other forms of financial aid offered by the institution include grants, other forms of repayable loans, and work-study programs. In 2018, 94% of all SSU students received some form of financial aid.

=== International programs ===
To broaden the university's approach, SSU has student and faculty exchange programs with several overseas institutions, including the Jaume I University in Spain, Al Akhawayn University in Morocco, Zhejiang University of Technology in China, and the Ludwigsburg University of Education in Germany.

International students studying at Shawnee State represent 1% of the student population.

== Student life ==
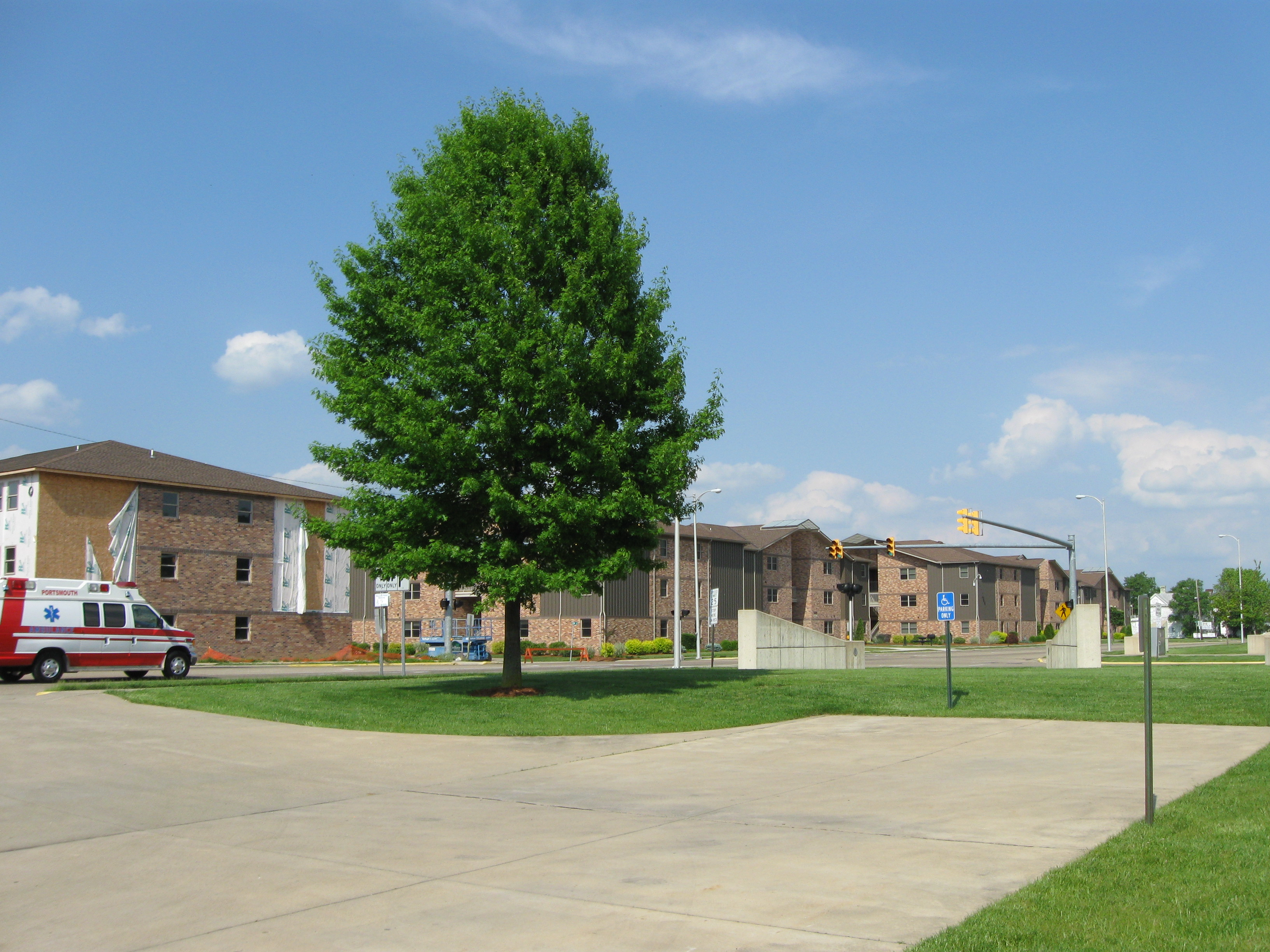
Student housing

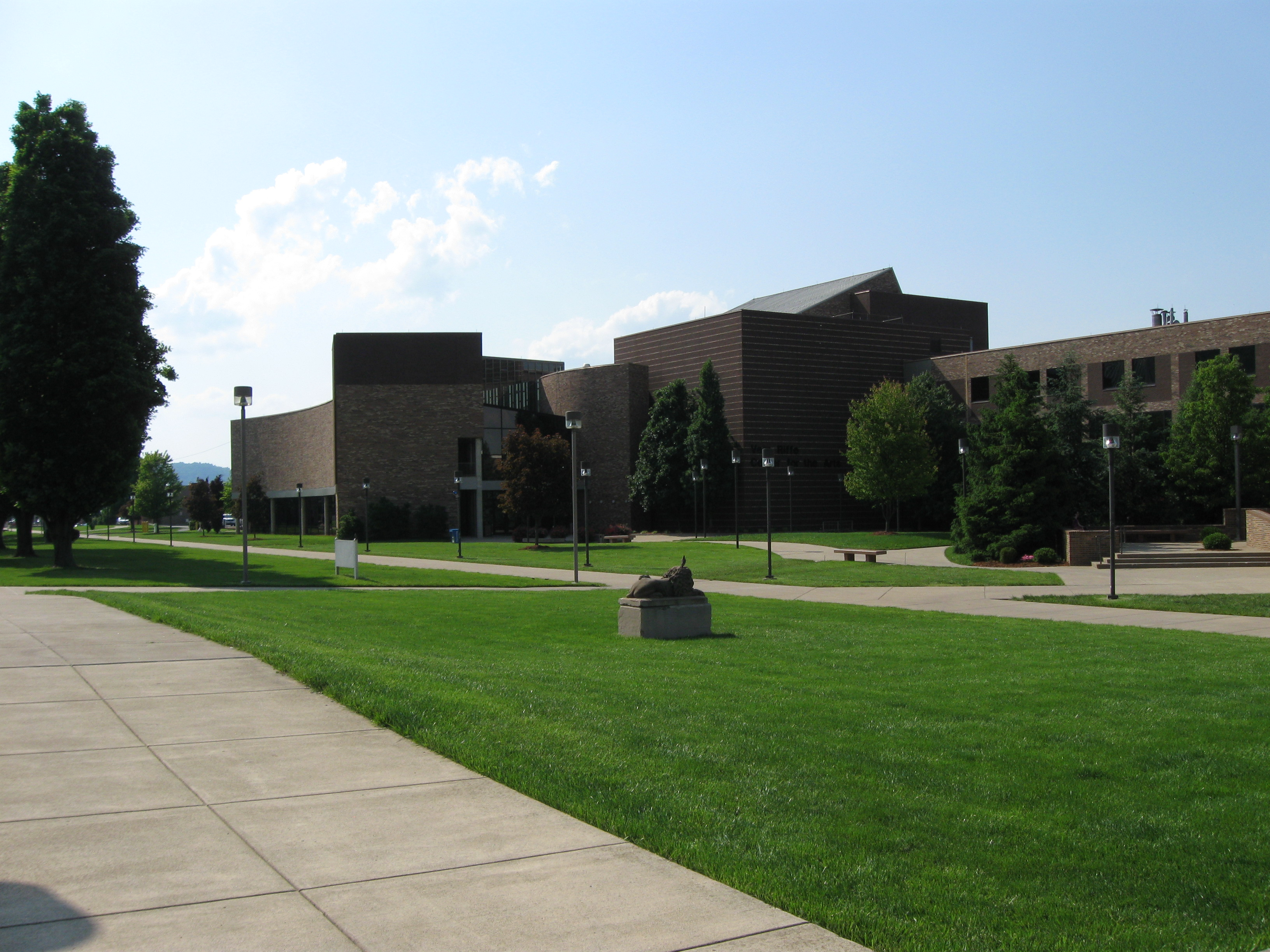
Verne Riffe Center for the Arts

Full-time-students are 90%, out-of-state students are 12%, female students are 54%, African American students are 5%, resident aliens are 1%, students living on campus are 26%, students in fraternities or sororities are 2%, and the average age for all students is 22 years.

Two students serve on the Shawnee State University Board of Trustees, the university's highest governing body. The students serve two-year terms. They are appointed by the Governor's Office of Appointments in the state of Ohio.

The university has on-campus housing for 934 students. All first-year students must live in university housing unless they are married, veterans, over age 23, or living with their parents.

Shawnee State has two sororities on campus, Theta Phi Alpha and Delta Phi Epsilon, and two fraternities, Tau Kappa Epsilon and Phi Mu Delta.

Clubs on campus include Art Club, Chemistry Club, Fantanime, Geology Club, History Club, International Game Developer's Association (IGDA), Political Science Club, Pre-Med Club, and Sexuality and Gender Acceptance (SAGA). and an international group, the Other World Society.

== Athletics ==
The Shawnee State athletic teams are called the Bears. The university is a member of the National Association of Intercollegiate Athletics (NAIA), primarily competing in the River States Conference (RSC) since the 2023–24 academic year. In the 2026–27 academic year, the Shawnee State teams will join the Mountain East Conference (MEC) pending their acceptance into NCAA Division II.

The Bears previously competed in the Mid-South Conference (MSC) from 2010–11 to 2022–23; the defunct American Mideast Conference (AMC) from 1991–92 to 2009–10; and as an Independent from 1986–87 (when the school began its athletics program and joined the NAIA) to 1990–91.

Shawnee State competes in the following intercollegiate varsity sports: Men's sports include baseball, basketball, bowling, cross country, golf, soccer, tennis, swimming, and track & field (indoor & outdoor); while women's sports include basketball, bowling, cross country, golf, soccer, softball, tennis, track & field (indoor & outdoor) and volleyball. They will add football in the 2026–27 academic year when they join the MEC.

== Notable people ==
=== Alumni ===
- Candice Cassidy, June 2009 Playboy Playmate of the Month, alumna in psychology
- Terry Craft, former American League Umpire
- EJ Onu, power forward for the Bamberg Baskets in the Basketball Bundesliga (BBL)
- Ted Strickland, former governor of Ohio and U.S. Representative, served as an assistant professor at the university before entering politics

=== Faculty ===
- Todd Book, former professor of Business Law
- Neil Carpathios, professor of English, poet, and coordinator of Creative Writing
