= Ruth Ella Moore =

American bacteriologist

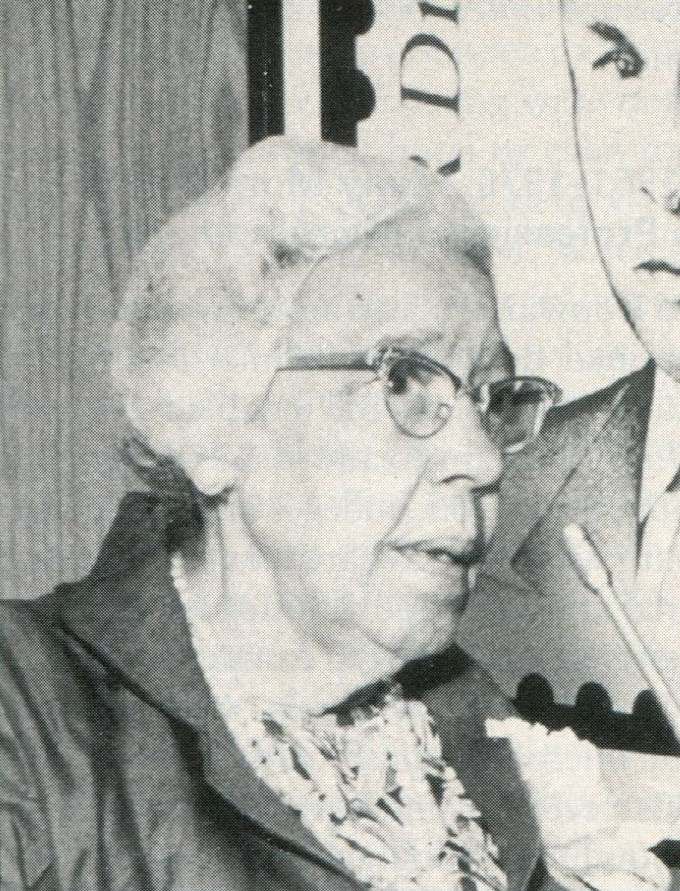
- Ruth Ella Moore
- Born: May 19, 1903; Columbus, Ohio
- Died: July 19, 1994 (aged 91); Rockville, Maryland
- Education: Ohio State University
- Known for: First African-American woman awarded a Ph.D. in the natural sciences; Bacteriology; Microbiology; Fashion design
- Parent(s): Margaret Moore; William E. Moore
- Scientific career
- Workplaces: Howard University

Ruth Ella Moore (May 19, 1903 – July 19, 1994) was an American bacteriologist and microbiologist, who, in 1933, became the first African-American woman to be awarded a Ph.D. in a natural science. She was a professor of bacteriology at Howard University. A decade later, she was installed as the head of the department of bacteriology, which she renamed to the department of microbiology. During that period she was promoted to associate professor of microbiology.

She published her research on tuberculosis, immunology, dental caries, the response of gut microorganisms to antibiotics, and the blood types of African-Americans.

Although there are gaps in the official personnel records of the university, Moore is believed to have continued to teach and conduct her research at Howard until 1973, after which she held the position of associate professor emeritus of microbiology until 1990.

Moore also gained recognition as a fashion designer.

== Early life and education ==
Ruth Ella Moore was born in Columbus, Ohio, to Margaret Moore and William E. Moore on May 19, 1903. She had two older brothers, Donovan L. Moore and William E. Moore. Her mother was a successful artist. As a graduate of Columbus State College of Art and Design, she always encouraged Ruth to strive for a college degree and beyond.

During her high school years, Moore attended multiple high schools in Columbus, Ohio. All of them were segregated and under resourced by the City of Columbus.

Moore attended the Ohio State University for both her undergraduate and graduate education. During her undergraduate years, Moore was a member of Delta Sigma Theta- one of the Divine nine sororities. She earned her Bachelor of Science degree in 1926 and her Master of Science degree in 1927. She was awarded her Ph.D. in bacteriology in 1933 from the university, making her the first Black woman in the United States to earn a PhD in the natural sciences, as well as the first African American of any gender to earn a PhD in Bacteriology. The Ohio State University was one of the few universities in the United States admitting Black students at the time.Despite significant record of Moore's attendance, graduation and further education at Ohio State University, there are noted gaps of Moore's entry in the chronological listing of bacteriology ph.D recipients of Ohio State University document archives.

Her dissertation was on the tuberculosis bacterium Mycobacterium tuberculosis. The two parts were entitled, "Studies on Dissociation of Mycobacterium Tuberculosis" and "A New Method of Concentration on the Tubercule Bacilli as Applied to Sputum And Urine Examination". At the time, tuberculosis was the second largest cause of death in the United States. This work was referenced in many later articles contributing to the eventual control of the disease.

== Career ==
In 1940, she became assistant professor of bacteriology at Howard University College of Medicine in Washington, D.C. In 1952, Moore became chair of the department of bacteriology. She was subsequently promoted to the position of associate professor. She was the first woman to be a department Head at the university, which is a historically Black university. Moore changed the department name from the department of bacteriology to the department of microbiology. In 1957, Moore stepped down from her departmental leadership position, but continued to teach and conduct research on bacteriology at the university. She retired from teaching at Howard University in 1973 and held the position of the associate professor emeritus of microbiology until 1990. It is unclear whether she ever received tenure despite her long career of teaching and research. Moore also held other positions at the university, serving as chair of the scholarship and loans committee, as well as chair of the student guidance committee.

Throughout her career she was a member of the American Public Health Association and the American Society of Microbiology, which she joined in 1936. Moore was the first African-American to join the American Society for Microbiology. As a Black woman, she faced restrictions to attending American Society for Microbiology meetings, particularly where Jim Crow laws were in effect, mandating segregation in hotels and conference venues. Moore also was a member of the American Association of Science, American Society of Immunology, the American Association of Microbiology, and the American Public Health Association.

Moore's research was published in a wide variety of professional journals and publications, from the Journal of the American Medical Association to the American Journal of Physical Anthropology. Some of her research included significant contributions in the study of blood types, dental caries (cavities), and the reaction of specific pathogens to different classes of antibiotics.

=== Research into blood types ===
Her publications in the 1950s were on blood types among African Americans.

In some of her earlier work, Moore did research on the distribution and differences in blood types between Black and white Americans. She based her study on the works of L. and H. Hirschfeld, Landsteiner, Wiener, Levine, Belkins and Sonn, Neal and Hanig, and Matson. Moore's study took place at Howard University College of Medicine. The university population included African Americans from throughout the United States. With few exemptions in the states represented, this diversity made her participants a random sample for Black Americans. Moore's study was used for a teaching program. It was conducted by pricking the fingers of participants to collect blood samples and using macroscopic and microscopic processes to observe the blood samples that were collected. Moore's experiment was split into three series, the first two series determined ABO blood types and the third series was used to determine the subgroups of ABO that are MN and Rh.

Throughout Moore's research she compared her results to that of the scientists who preceded her, such as Landsteiner and Weiner, who discovered the Rh factor in human blood. When concluding her experiment, she was able to determine that the results from her MN study did not fully correspond with the results of the former experimenter, but her investigation into Rh types did correspond with that of the previous experimenter. Comparison of her results to those of the other experiments suggested that Rh blood types might be a good starting ground for studying and building a foundation of knowledge about different racial backgrounds.

Beyond Moore's study of Rh and MN blood types, she also discovered in a group of 2496 African Americans that 51.94% of them were in Group O, 17.32% in Group B, only 27.3% were in Group A, and 3.01% in AB. That data corresponded with an earlier experiment in physical anthropology whose results demonstrated the types O and B were more prominent in African Americans than the other blood types.

=== Research on dental caries (cavities) ===
Dr. Moore was the only author of a 1938 paper titled "The Immunology of Dental Caries", about the etiological agents contributing to formation of dental caries (cavities). The article was published in The Dentoscope, a publication by the Howard School of Dentistry.

Her investigations yielded an association of Lactobacillus acidophilus with cavities which she hypothesized to be an instigating factor. Specifically, the organism was shown to satisfy the first two rules of Koch's postulates, while the other two had previously been demonstrated in vivo. It was shown that L. acidophilus was present in the mouths of patients susceptible to cavities, but the species was absent from patients without cavities. She therefore hypothesized the saliva of patients without cavities had antibiotic properties against L. acidophilus. It is now known that this association with cavities occurs after the cavities have already formed, rather than this species being causal to their formation. She also hypothesized that having a diet high in carbohydrates is a predisposing factor for cavity formation by selecting for specific species including L. acidophilus.

It was shown that there was a correlation between skin reactions to L. acidophilus filtrate injections and susceptibility to cavities. These reactions were not similar to those described in the Dick test and the Schick test, both of which were used to detect different types of biological toxins (see Dick test and Schick test). Additionally, no toxins had been identified from L. acidophilus, leading Dr. Moore to conclude that the likely explanation was an allergy to the bacterium. However, it was also noted that patients free of caries (cavities) also had skin reactions to L. acidophilus filtrate.

The study also included experiments of vaccines on children. Vaccines with different phases of L. acidophilus were included; some vaccines had the rough (R) phase, some had the smooth (S) phase, and some had a mixed phase with both (see Griffith's experiment). R phase vaccines caused abscesses at the site of injection and also increased agglutinin titer, while smooth vaccines did not. Mixed phase vaccines also caused abscesses. The causative agent of these abscesses was not determined.

=== Research on gut microbiomes ===
In 1963 she published research on the sensitivity of gut microorganisms to antibiotics. The 1963 publication studied gut isolated microbes of the Death's Head Cockroach, Blaberus caniifer Burmeister, by isolating pure cultures from the cockroach gut and culturing them on trypticase soy agar. Moore later tested the cultures for antimicrobial susceptibility and antibiotic resistance by placing disks containing antibiotics at various concentrations on the plates (see Disk diffusion test). After incubation, Moore considered the bacteria sensitive to the antibiotic if there was a zone of inhibition present around the disk and as resistant to the antibiotic if there was no zone of inhibition around the disk. Additionally, the study investigated whether antibiotics were bacteriostatic or bactericidal by removing agar from the zones of inhibition and culturing in nutrient broth. If these liquid cultures showed growth, the antibiotic was concluded to be bacteriostatic, and if there was no growth, the antibiotic was concluded to be bactericidal. Her work is considered some of the earliest on microbiomes.

== Honors ==
Moore is believed to be the first African-American woman to earn a Ph.D. in the natural sciences, which she received from Ohio State University. Additionally, she was awarded two honorary degrees during her career, a doctorate in literature from Oberlin College and, in 1973, a doctorate of philosophy from Gettysburg College.

Moore received the Centennial Award for Distinguished Alumni from Ohio State University.

In 2005, U.S. Representative Eddie Bernice Johnson introduced a congressional bill recognizing the work of Ruth Ella Moore along with that of other scientists in the United States.

Ohio State University College of Public Health created the Ella Moore First Generation Student Scholarship to honor Moore’s legacy and to support upcoming trailblazers in a similar field.

== Lifetime passion for fashion design ==
Moore was also a seamstress with a passion for fashion design shared with her mother.

She loved elegant, classic styles of clothing and designed and constructed her own garments for most occasions, from day to evening wear, and from tailored to draped components.

Several garments designed by Moore were featured in works such as The Sewer's Art: Quality, Fashion, and Economy in 2009. Some of her most notable creations include a two-piece suit composed of an off-white jacket and a black skirt, a long velvet dress, and a taffeta dress that was floor-length and covered in flowers of many colors. The HCTC's Sports & Fashion has one of Moore's swimsuits on display, but due to the lack of labels and dates from the 1930s, no one is sure whether she made it or purchased the stylish garment.

== Death ==
Moore died at the age of 91 on July 19, 1994, in Rockville, Maryland. In her obituary- posted by the Washington Post- Moore was quoted saying "I have lived a life of peace and enjoyment, loving my family, friends, church and all.”

== See also ==
- List of people from Columbus, Ohio
- List of Ohio State University people
- List of Howard University people
- Timeline of women in science
