= Diocese of Ensenada =

Roman Catholic diocese in Mexico

Diocese of Ensenada Dioecesis Sinuensis Diócesis de Ensenada
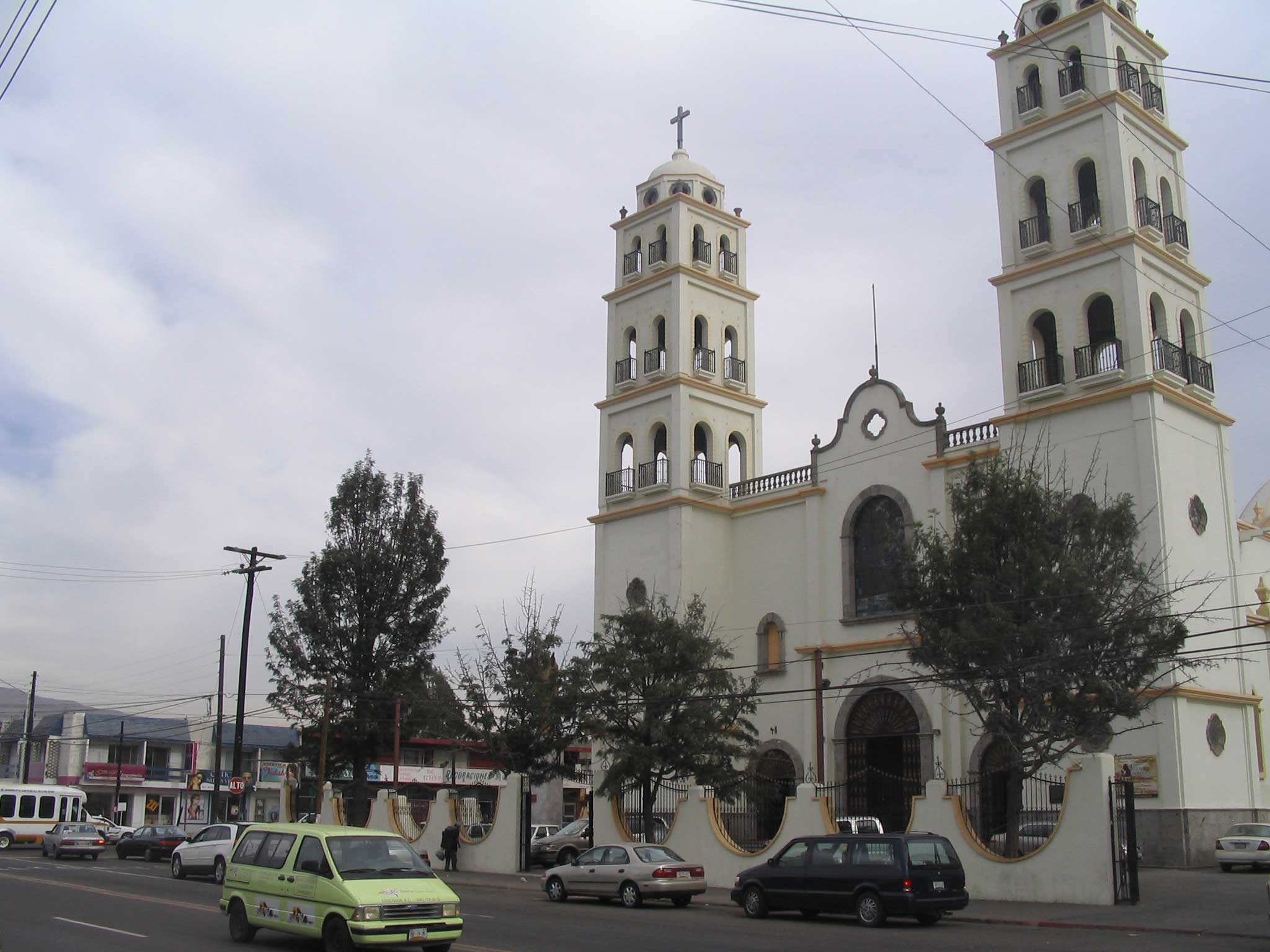
- Cathedral of Our Lady of Guadalupe

Location
- Country: Mexico
- Ecclesiastical province: Province of Tijuana
- Metropolitan: Tijuana

Statistics
- Area: 20,334 sq mi (52,660 km^{2})
- Population: Total; Catholics: (as of 2007); 658,899; 621,346 (94.3%)
- Parishes: 23

Information
- Denomination: Roman Catholic
- Rite: Roman Rite
- Established: 26 January 2007 (18 years ago)
- Cathedral: Cathedral of Our Lady of Guadalupe

Current leadership
- Pope: Leo XIV
- Bishop: Rafael Valdéz Torres

Map

Website
- diocesisensenada.org

The Roman Catholic Diocese of Ensenada (Latin: Dioecesis Sinuensis) (erected 26 January 2007) is a suffragan diocese of the Archdiocese of Tijuana.

== Ordinaries ==
- Sigifredo Noriega Barceló (2007—2012), appointed Bishop of Zacatecas, México
- Rafael Valdéz Torres (since 2013)

== Episcopal See ==
- Ensenada, Baja California
