= Karl "Dyzee" Alba =

Professional b-boy (break dancer)

Dyzee
- Born: Karl Olivier Alba; September 29, 1979 (age 46)
- Known for: B-boying
- Movement: Hip-hop

Karl Oliver Alba, also known as Dyzee (pronounced dizzy) (born 1979) is a professional b-boy (break dancer) from Toronto, Canada. He is recorded in the Guinness Book of World Records, holding the longest b-boy circle (24 hours straight). He is member of Supernaturalz and 7 Commandoz.

== 7 Commandoz ==
Member	Crewbase
(Canada) Dyzee	Supernaturalz
(South Korea) Skim	Jinjo
(South Korea) Wing	Jinjo / Red Bull BC One All-Stars
(South Korea) Differ	TIP / FRZM Movement
(South Korea) Hong 10	Flow XL / Red Bull BC One All-Stars
(United States) Ronnie	Full Force / Super Cr3w / Red Bull BC One All-Stars
(Canada) Phil	United Rivals / Wizards / Black Market

== Documentary Appearances ==
Dyzee was one of the main characters in the motion picture BBoy documentary "All Out War"

In 2010, BBoy Dyzee appeared in an award-winning documentary about his work to create a scoring system for professional BBoy competitions.
