= Galen Starr Ross =

American academic (1895–1980)

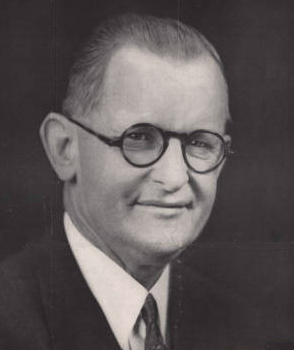
- Dr. Galen Starr Ross
- Born: Galen Starr Ross; May 17, 1895; Columbus, Ohio, U.S.
- Died: November 2, 1980 (aged 85)
- Occupations: Lecturer, Physiologist

Galen Starr Ross (1895–1980) was an American academic and college president. He was an educator, researcher, writer, politician, and noted orator.

== Biography ==
Ross was widely known as a lecturer and institute instructor. He was president of Capitol College in Columbus which was renamed Dominion University when it relocated to Westerville Ohio. He succeeded Frank S. Fox as president of the school. He remained president for many years and greatly advanced the scholastic departments of the college and brought the school much positive publicity. The present day Dominion University of Westerville Ohio dedicated the Galen Starr Ross Research Department of the School of Psychology and Behavioral Sciences to his honor. At the age of 30 Ross is said to have created a successful enterprise. Ross reported that in the mid-1930s he initiated a research project to analyze the underlying political and psychological conditions in the United States by gathering public opinion and interviewing various political parties. He further related that after resigning his position as educational director and assistant to the president of a large Detroit industry, he privately raised $15,000 and hired two associates to travel throughout the United States with him. He allegedly managed to be present at many violent labor disputes and interviewed numbers of businessmen and factory workers in addition to visiting hospitals, schools, and business conventions. During a span of eight years they reported covering 208,000 miles throughout 37 states. Dr. Ross claimed to have gained an insight into the failure of the country's schools, churches, and industry. He next began to present his research through books, newspapers and university lectures and after becoming president of Capitol College in Columbus Ohio offered a master's degree majoring in Industrial Psychology and Economics, and minoring in Speech and 'Personalysis — the science of human relations.' Ross was advertised as "America's No. 1 Industrial Psychologist" and "one of the great orators and fearless columnists of the day." He was further advertised as one of the "hot names in the platform and psychology worlds." Ross moved from Columbus to Michigan where he resided until his death in 1980.

== Political career ==
Ross was a Democratic candidate for governor of Ohio in the 1930s. He was later nominated Republican candidate in primary for U.S. Representative from Michigan 2nd District in 1944 but lost to Earl C. Michener. He corresponded extensively with the president, Franklin D. Roosevelt, and his wife, Eleanor Roosevelt, about race relations, music education, Veterans Administration and various political issues. He wrote widely for newspapers and magazines. Dr. George Crane of The Gadson Times called him the "Most articulate college president in all of America" and compared an altercation against Ross to a presidential assassination saying the attack was, "just a twin for the cowardly ambushed shooting of our late president Kennedy." Crane was referring to an incident which took place some time after Dr. Ross had given a speech supporting the "right to work" measure then before the Ohio voters. A man, allegedly of socialist persuasion, stepped unexpectedly from behind a tree and struck the 70-year-old professor in the eye, breaking his glasses and permanently damaging his eyesight. He is reported to have further "bashed in Dr. Ross's front teeth."

== Public speech ==
Ross frequented speaking engagements before large crowds. He was described as having "delivered fifteen hundred successful public addresses throughout the United States." His lecture on "Success Insurance" was a commencement speech for high schools and colleges. He had delivered over 500 commencement addresses by 1964. One newspaper editor wrote that Ross was "a thinking genius, who is guided by his heart and a choice vocabulary that is streamlined and up-to-date." Ross expressed his moral and religious convictions saying, "America's hour of decision is at hand, but this great land of ours has not a single problem that good sense, good manners, good humor, hard work and faith in Almighty God can't solve." A noted minister wrote, "Out of his wide experience with the heartaches of mankind and his own deep religious convictions, he has a message that should be heard all over America."
