= Michael G. Davis =

Michael G. Davis (b. May 31, 1959) was an American meteorologist in Columbus, Ohio, working for WBNS-TV for more than 30 years. An Emmy Awards and AP Award winner, in 2019 he was arrested and eventually convicted of having in his possession 15,912 images of child pornography.

== Career and conviction ==
Davis was educated at the University of Minnesota, obtaining a degree in journalism. He then studied meteorology at the Ohio State University. Prior to joining WBNS, he worked for stations in Las Vegas, Idaho, and Minnesota.

Coming back to Ohio, he resided in Upper Arlington, a suburb of Columbus, and was married with three children. While at WBNS, he wrote the book "The ABCs of Ohio Weather", and supported numerous charitable organizations. He visited locals schools to teach the students about weather. At the Franklin Park Conservatory, he curated the exhibit "Mike Davis Weather Adventure", and at COSI the "The Ocean Above, Our Global Weather" exhibit. He had a passion for family and wine.

In addition to WBNS, he provided his services to WSNY radio.

In 2019, the National Center for Missing & Exploited Children received information about child pornography traced to a Central Ohio email address. The images involved young girls engaged in sex acts with adults. After interviewing Davis on September 5, the Franklin County Sheriff's Department accepted his admission of possession, and subsequently obtained a search warrant for his laptops at WBNS. WBNS would fire him, and he would eventually be convicted and sentenced to 4 years in prison after pleading guilty to avoid a maximum sentence of 29.5 years.

He would serve his time at Grafton Correctional Institution, considered the best prison in the Ohio system. There he would continue writing books. In a 2021 court filing for early judicial release, his lawyer Adam Nemann stated he was seeing a psychologist, taking medications, attending AA meetings, and participated in anxiety and Cage My Rage therapy groups, while working as a porter. His lawyer stated that Davis' fall from grace was worse than a prison sentence and that the conviction ruined his career.

Davis was released in 2024, first residing at an Extended Stay America in Columbus, and eventually an apartment complex in the Tri-Village neighborhood of Columbus. He will be registered as a tier-2 sex offender for 25 years.
