= Gilberto Valbuena Sánchez =

Mexican priest and theologian (1929–2021)

- Bishop Emeritus of Colima
- Church: Catholic Church
- Diocese: Diocese of Colima
- Appointed: 8 July 1989
- Retired: 9 June 2005
- Predecessor: José Fernández Arteaga
- Successor: José Luis Amezcua Melgoza
- Previous posts: Bishop of La Paz en la Baja California Sur (1988-1989); Vicar Apostolic of La Paz en la Baja California Sur (1976-1988); Titular Bishop of Vazari-Didda (1972-1988); Auxiliary Bishop of Tacámbaro (1972-1976)

Orders
- Ordination: 21 May 1955
- Consecration: 8 February 1973 by José Abraham Martínez Betancourt

Personal details
- Born: 4 February 1929 Chietla, Puebla, Mexico
- Died: 22 December 2021 (aged 92) Puebla, Mexico

Gilberto Valbuena Sánchez (4 February 1929 – 22 December 2021) was a Mexican Roman Catholic prelate. Valbuena Sánchez was born in Chietla, Puebla on 4 February 1929. He was bishop of Colima from 1989 to 2005.
