= Allyssa Wolf =

American poet (born 1971)

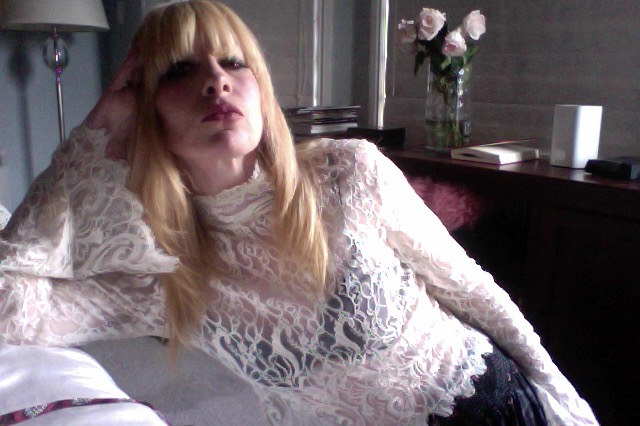
- Wolf, photographed in 2015
- Born: 1971 (age 54–55); Columbus, Ohio, U.S.
- Writing career
- Genres: Poet, writer
- Notable work: Vaudeville
- Notable awards: Gertrude Stein Award; 1st runner-up Robin Blaser Award

Allyssa Wolf (born 1971) is an American poet. She released her first book of poems, Vaudeville, in 2006 and a second tract, Loquela, was published in 2011. Her poetry was part of the Bunker Poetico installation and anthology for the 49th Venice Bienalle and a chapbook entitled The Book of Coming and Going Forth by Day was published in 2013. She is the recipient of a 2006 Gertrude Stein Award and was first runner-up for the Robin Blaser Award in 2015.

== Personal life ==
Born in Columbus, Ohio, Wolf left home at seventeen and moved to the Lower East Side of Manhattan. She has since lived in Los Angeles, and, currently, San Francisco.

== Career ==
Her first book of poems Vaudeville was published in 2006 under the imprint Seismicity Editions, by the Otis College of Art and Design. She is the recipient of a 2006 Gertrude Stein Award.

Her poetry was part of the Bunker Poetico installation and anthology for the 49th Venice Bienalle. Her second tract, Loquela, was published in 2011 by Insert Blanc Press. A chapbook, The Book of Coming and Going Forth by Day was published in 2013.

She has said she is working on a novel called 'The Murder of the Real and has reportedly resumed writing poetry.

== Critical reception ==
Jacket magazine said of Vaudeville: "Read this book in a theatre or in the street propped on a fire hydrant. Read it between classes, in the library, on a train; read it at a poetry reading, read it in jail — anywhere. It is that book which begs to be myth. I have not seen pages nor have I heard poems. No. Reading this book I have allowed myself the gift of beauty redivivus!"

Recently, poet and critic Philip Jenks, reassessed the importance of Vaudeville, at The Poetry Foundation, saying, "It’s been ten years since Allyssa Wolf’s Vaudeville was published. It says so on the page, but I’m having trouble believing. Dare to suggest a timeless text was written not in some other era, not by some dead white man, not. I cannot prove anything (the analytics versus “Being, but an Ear” (Dickinson 340)), oppose the best of, but Wolf's is verse in its purest form. Speaks to and with. Ghosts, power relations, inhabitations, gender powers, the animals, comedic horrors, and language twisting old English into the presences, or wars, just: “twisting the night away” (Wolf 37). It's a “real show” with all the horror and comity of being, shredded thus", and, "Generativity, producing, creating, these makings of words and deeds to thieve from Arendt—they are fully capable of producing horrors if one seeks to create only within the loneliness of those “grave and grainy” rooms of modernity or postmodernity or what have you. Unless we make in concert with one another, without the in-between, world become monster. A) The Holocaust never ended and B) It was/is born of a continual alienation. And it is these truths that Allyssa Wolf's beckons the reader to perhaps examine. It is night everywhere... A sort of “night of the world” as Hegel wrote.."

== Awards ==
The first poem of Vaudeville was chosen for a PIP Gertrude Stein Award for Innovative Writing by Douglas Messerli. "Allyssa Wolf...╬Winner of the PIP Gertrude Stein Awards for Innovative Poetry in English 2005-2006 for her poem, "First Doll".

Allyssa Wolf won First Runner-up for the Capilano's Review's Fourth Annual Robin Blaser Award (2015), chosen by Daphne Marlatt.

== Works ==
- Vaudeville. Otis Books/Seismicity Editions. 12 May 2015. ISBN 978-0-9755924-4-1.
- Loquela. Insert Press. 12 May 2015. OCLC 667638144.

== Anthologies ==
- PIP Gertrude Stein Award in Innovative Poetry in English. Green Integer. 12 May 2015. ISBN 978-1-933382-69-2.
- Poesia in Azione: Anthology of the Bunker Poetico project for the 49th Venice Bienalle. Milanocosa. 12 May 2015.
