= Rogaciano Alba =

Current head of Guerrero's cattle ranching union

Rogaciano Alba Alvarez (Rogaciano Alba) is the current head of Guerrero's cattle ranching union (Guerrero cattlemen's association). He was mayor of Petatlán and is a rancher. In 2002 he was investigated for involvement in the murder of Digna Ochoa, a human rights lawyer, Zapatista supporter and anti-logging activist. He was also accused of involvement in the murder of Merejildo Torres. On May 4, 2008 his home was attacked by forty gunmen. His two sons, Alejandro and Rusbel, were killed, his daughter kidnapped and at least seven other people killed.
