= Gregory Franks =

American investor (born 1958)

Greg Franks
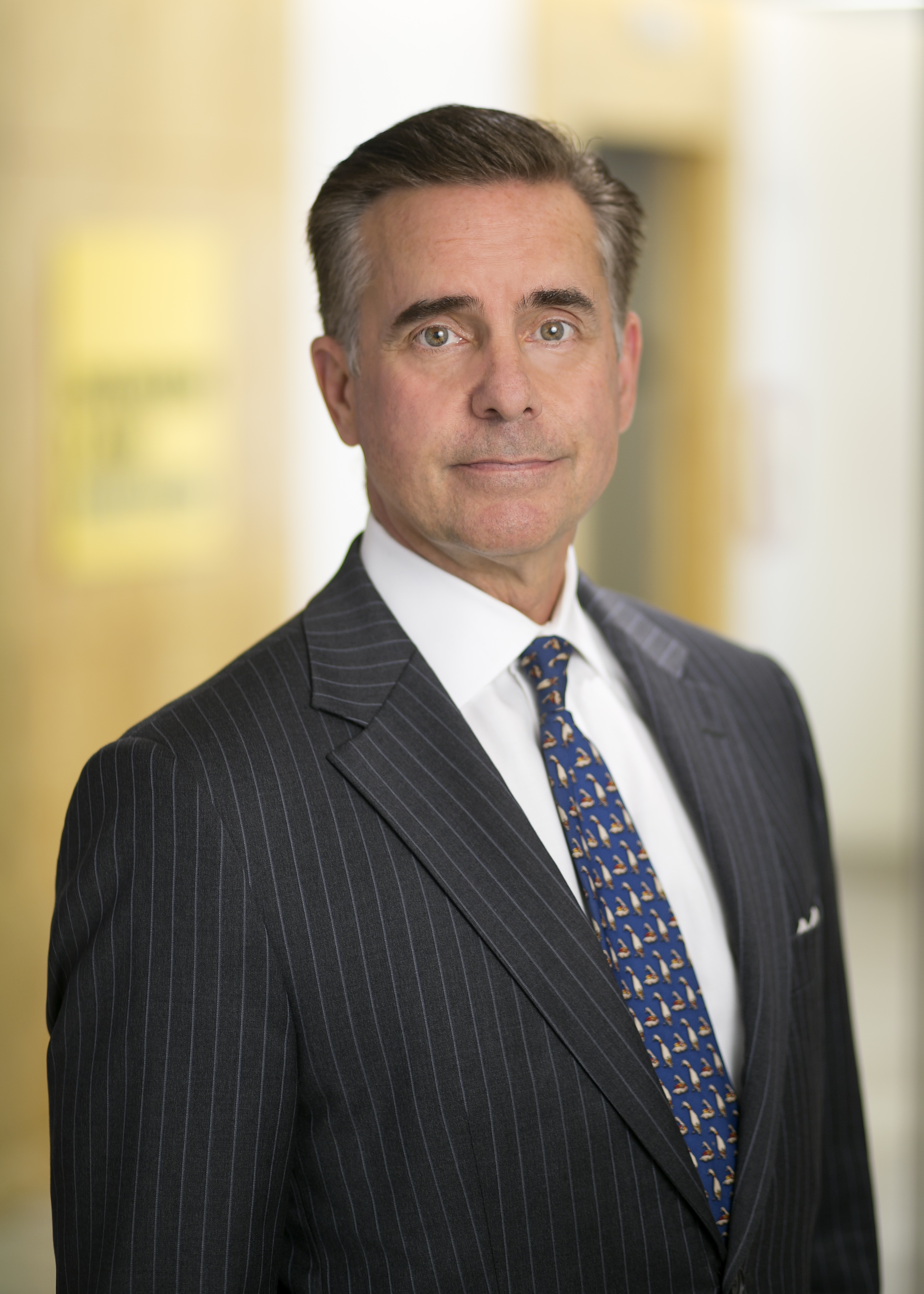
- Born: Gregory Creech Franks; August 7, 1958 (age 67); Columbus, Ohio, U. S.
- Occupations: Investment banker, stockbroker, financier

Gregory Franks (born August 7, 1958) is an American wealth management executive and private investor. He spent twenty-eight years at Merrill Lynch in senior leadership positions in the United States, Europe, and the Middle East.

He currently serves as president and managing partner of Snowden Lane Partners, an independent HNW wealth management organization.

== Early life and education ==
Franks was born in Columbus, Ohio and has three half-sisters, Beth, Jennifer and Anne.

He received a B.A. in marketing from Franklin Pierce College and is a graduate of the Securities Industry Institute of The Wharton School.

== Life and career ==
Franks joined Merrill Lynch in 1983 as an Account Executive in its New Orleans office. In 1989 he was named the Director of the Houston, Texas, office and later managed the London, England, office. In 1992 he was named the District Director of the Middle East and relocated to Dubai, U.A.E. Upon returning to the United States, he was based in New York as the Eastern Division Marketing Manager.

Franks has held additional roles as Managing Director in Baltimore, Maryland, Divisional Managing Director in the Mid-Atlantic, Regional Managing Director in the Mid-Atlantic, Western Division Director for Bank of America Merrill Lynch, and Maryland state president for Bank of America. He served on the Wealth Management Operating Committee for Merrill Lynch and in 2009 was named Bank of America's top executive for its Baltimore and Maryland markets.

During his time as Managing Director, Franks was responsible for over 5,000 advisors, $450 billion in client assets and $4 billion in annual revenue. In 2011, Franks retired from his dual position as the mid-Atlantic President at Bank of America and director of Merrill Lynch Wealth Management's western division.

In 2012, Franks and three partners launched Snowden Capital Advisors, an independent RIA wealth management firm. The firm reached $1B assets under management in 2014. In 2015 and 2016, the firm was named one of the top 300 RIA's in the country by the Financial Times. As of March 2021, the firm oversees over $9 billion in domestic and international client assets. In 2021, Snowden Lane Partners was named one of Barron's top 100 RIA firms for the second year in a row. As of June 2022, Snowden Lane remains backed by private equity firm Estancia Capital Partners and secured a $50 million credit facility from Orix. In January 2023, Snowden Lane secured an additional $100 million credit line with Apogem Capital and Monroe Capital, and in April 2023 the firm was named one of USA Today's top 500 financial advisors, out of a universe of 32,000.

== Personal life ==
He lives between Baltimore, Maryland, and New York, New York, with his wife and three children. Franks is involved in numerous charitable and philanthropic activities.
