= Francisco Moreno Barrón =

Mexican Roman Catholic archbishop (1954–2025)

The Most Reverend Francisco Moreno Barrón
- Archbishop of Tijuana
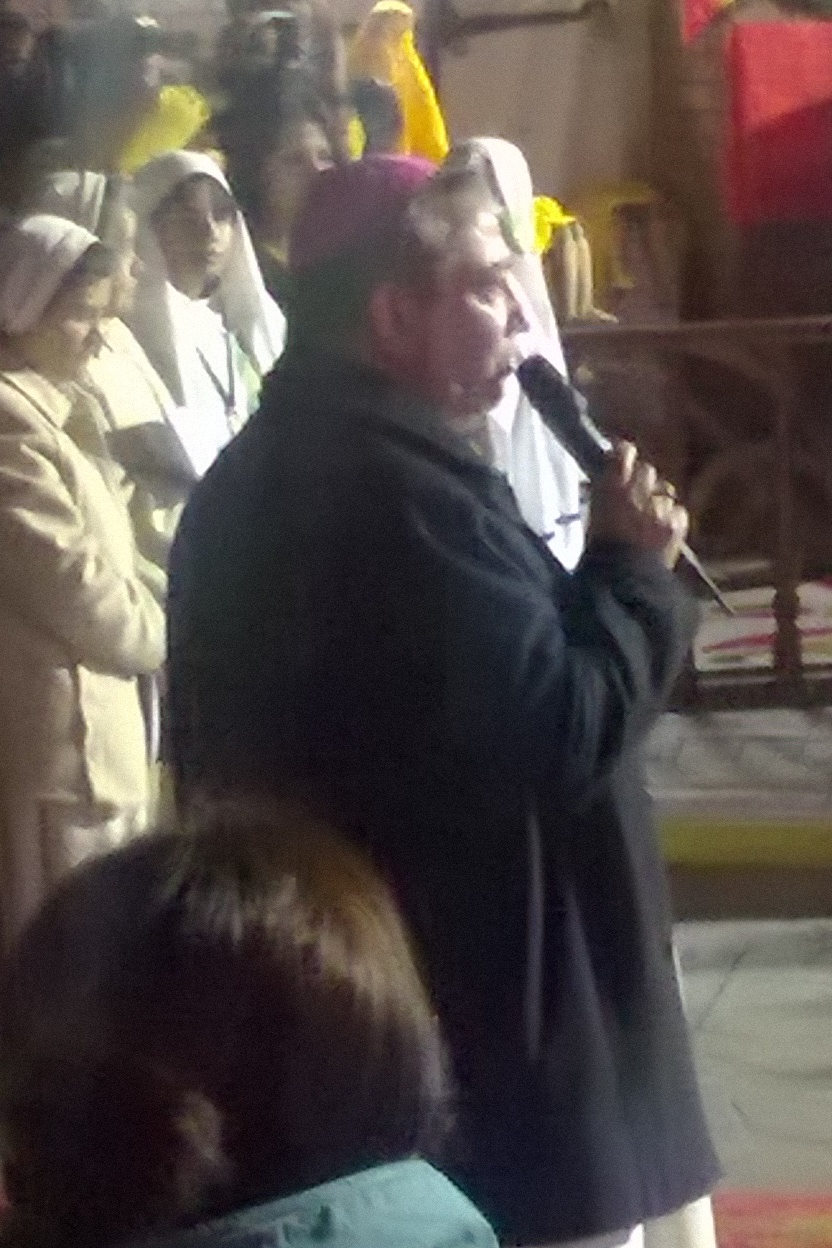
- Barrón in 2015
- Church: Roman Catholic Church
- Archdiocese: Tijuana
- See: Tijuana
- Appointed: 16 June 2016
- Installed: 11 August 2016
- Term ended: 26 October 2025
- Predecessor: Rafael Romo Muñoz
- Successor: Vacant
- Previous posts: Titular Bishop of Gaguari and Auxiliary Bishop of Morelia (2002–08); Bishop of Tlaxcala (2008–16)

Orders
- Ordination: 25 February 1979 by Estanislao Alcaraz Figueroa
- Consecration: 20 March 2002 by Alberto Suárez Inda, Giuseppe Bertello and Carlos Suárez Cázares

Personal details
- Born: Francisco Moreno Barrón; 3 October 1954 Salamanca, Guanajuato, Mexico
- Died: 26 October 2025 (aged 71) Tijuana, Baja California, Mexico
- Motto: Unidos en la misericordia ("United in mercy")
- Coat of arms

Styles of Francisco Moreno Barrón
- Reference style: His Excellency; The Most Reverend
- Spoken style: Your Excellency
- Religious style: Archbishop

Francisco Moreno Barrón (3 October 1954 – 26 October 2025) was a Mexican bishop who served as auxiliary bishop in the Archdiocese of Morelia from 2002 to 2008. On 28 March 2008 Benedict XVI appointed him as the third bishop of Tlaxcala. He was installed in the diocese on 28 May 2008, and subsequently served as shepherd of the diocese. On 16 June 2016, Pope Francis appointed him Archbishop of Tijuana.

== Biography ==
Francisco Moreno Barrón was born in the city of Salamanca, Guanajuato, on 3 October 1954. He studied for the priesthood at the Seminary of Morelia, which he entered in 1966.

He was ordained a priest by the then-Archbishop Emeritus of Morelia, Estanislao Alcaraz Figueroa, on 25 February 1979. For five years he served as pastor in the parish of Santa Ana in Zacapu, Michoacán, and later was rector of the Temple of Christ the King in Morelia, responsible for diocesan youth ministry. He was rector and first pastor of the Lord of Mercy in Morelia until 2000, when he was appointed Episcopal Vicar.

On 2 February 2002 Pope John Paul II appointed him as an Auxiliary Bishop of Morelia. On 20 March 2002 he was consecrated by Mons. Alberto Suárez Inda. He continued to work with young people in the Mexican Episcopal Conference until 28 March 2008, when he was appointed third bishop of Tlaxcala by Pope Benedict XVI. Pope Francis later appointed him as the Archbishop of Tijuana on 16 June 2016.

Moreno Barrón died on 26 October 2025, after three years of battling mesothelioma. He was 71.

Catholic Church titles
Preceded by Rafael Romo Muñoz	Archbishop of Tijuana; 2016–2025	Succeeded by Vacant
Preceded by Jacinto Guerrero Torres	Bishop of Tlaxcala; 2008–2016	Succeeded by Julio César Salcedo Aquino
Preceded by —	Auxiliary Bishop of Morelia; 2002–2008	Succeeded by —
Preceded by Sixtus Josef Parzinger	Titular Bishop of Gaguari; 2002–2008	Succeeded by Manuel Aurelio Cruz
