= Emilio Carlos Berlie Belaunzarán =

Mexican prelate (born 1939)

The Most Reverend Emilio Carlos Berlie Belaunzarán
- Archbishop of Yucatán
- Church: Roman Catholic Church
- Archdiocese: Yucatán
- See: Yucatán
- Appointed: 15 March 1995
- Installed: 29 April 1995
- Term ended: 1 July 2015
- Predecessor: Manuel Castro Ruiz
- Successor: Gustavo Rodríguez Vega
- Previous post: Bishop of Tijuana (1983-95)

Orders
- Ordination: 3 July 1966 by Pope Paul VI
- Consecration: 25 July 1983 by Girolamo Prigione

Personal details
- Born: 4 November 1939 (age 86) Aguascalientes City, Aguascalientes, Mexico
- Motto: in nomine domini ("In the name of God")

Emilio Carlos Berlie Belaunzarán (born 4 November 1939) is a Mexican Catholic prelate who served as of Bishop of Tijuana from 1983 to 1995, and later Archbishop of Yucatán from 1995 to 2015.

== Biography ==
Berlie was ordained by Pope Paul VI as a priest on 3 July 1966. He was appointed by Pope John Paul II as Bishop of Tijuana on 3 June 1983. The apostolic nuncio in Mexico, Girolamo Prigione, consecrated him as a bishop on 25 July of the same year. Berlie's co-consecrators were Salvador Quezada Limón, Bishop of Aguascalientes, and Juan Jesús Posadas Ocampo, Bishop of Cuernavaca.

On 15 March 1995, Berlie was appointed Archbishop of Yucatán and inaugurated on 29 April. In 2013, he was appointed by Pope Benedict XVI as a member of the Pontifical Commission for Latin America. In 2015, Berlie retired as archbishop and Pope Francis accepted his retirement on 1 June.
