= Archdiocese of Tijuana =

Roman Catholic archdiocese in Mexico

Coordinates: 32.5354°N 117.0410°W

Archdiocese of Tijuana Archidioecesis Tigiuanaënsis Arquidiócesis de Tijuana
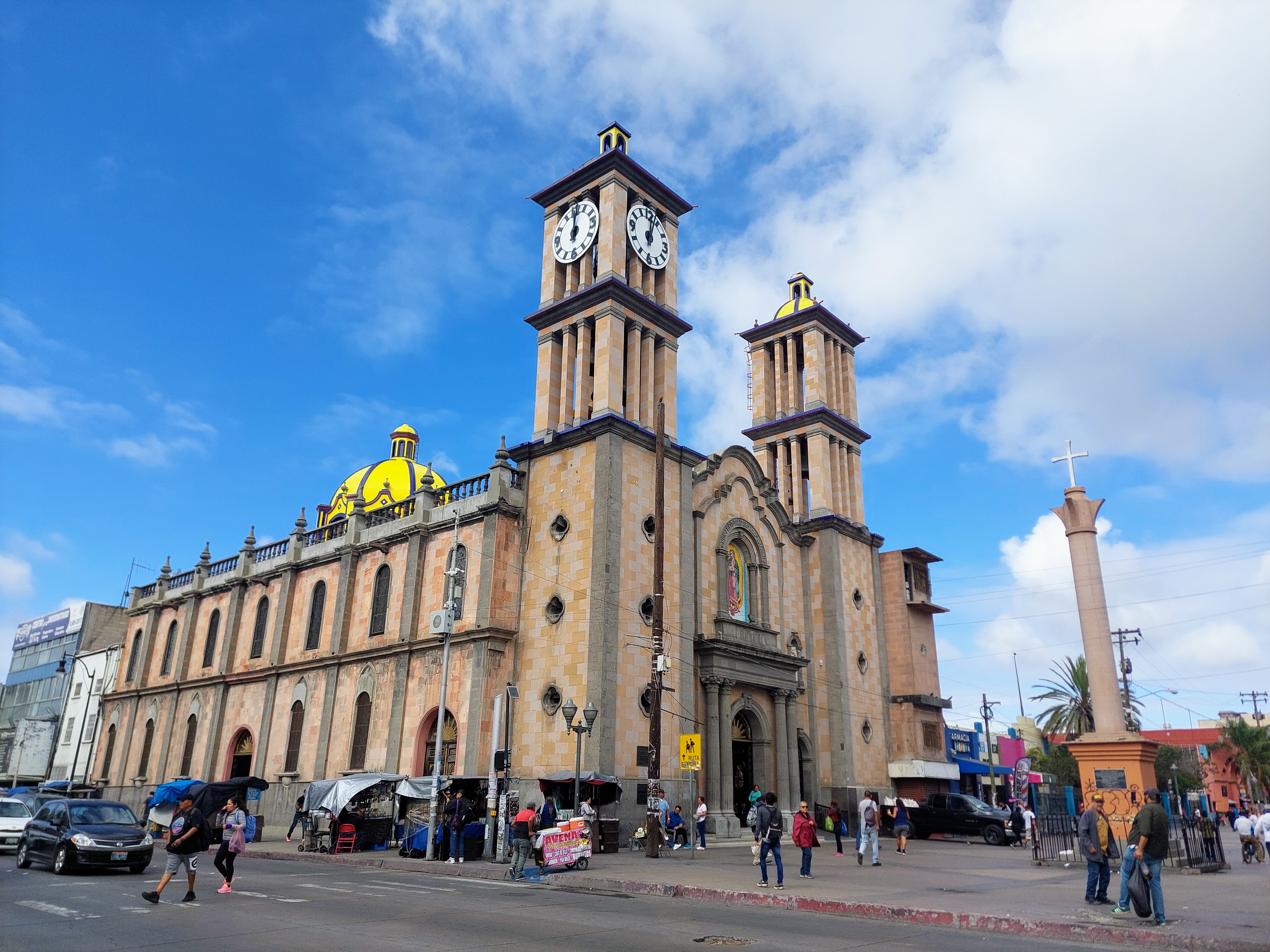
- Catedral de Nuestra Señora de Guadalupe

Location
- Country: Mexico
- Ecclesiastical province: Province of Tijuana
- Metropolitan: Tijuana

Statistics
- Area: 9,641 sq mi (24,970 km^{2})
- Population: Total; Catholics: (as of 2010); 2,284,000; 2,170,000 (95%)
- Parishes: 95

Information
- Denomination: Roman Catholic
- Rite: Roman Rite
- Established: 20 January 1874 (151 years ago)
- Cathedral: Cathedral of Our Lady of Guadalupe

Current leadership
- Pope: Leo XIV
- Archbishop: Sede vacante
- Auxiliary Bishops: Mario Nicolás Villanueva Arellano
- Bishops emeritus: Rafael Romo Muñoz

Map

Website
- www.iglesiatijuana.org

The Roman Catholic Archdiocese of Tijuana (Latin: Archidioecesis Tigiuanaënsis) is a Metropolitan Archdiocese in Mexico. It is based in the city of Tijuana, Baja California, and the province has the suffragan dioceses of Ensenada, La Paz en la Baja California Sur, and Mexicali.

It was founded in 1855 as a vicariate for the Baja California's missions that were under the apostolic administration of the Archdiocese of Mexico City (until the 1848 Treaty of Guadalupe Hidalgo they were part of the Roman Catholic Diocese of California).

Pope Pius IX created the Apostolic Vicariate of Baja California in 1874. The see of the apostolic vicariate was in La Paz until 1939, later in Ensenada and, since 1944, in Tijuana.

In 1957 the southern part of Baja California became a separate apostolic prefecture (the current Diocese of La Paz en la Baja California Sur) and in 1963 the apostolic vicariate became the Diocese of Tijuana (Archdiocese since 2006).

== Bishops ==
=== Ordinaries ===
- Ramón María de San José Moreno y Castañeda, O. Carm. (1873–1879). appointed Bishop of Chiapas (Ciudad Real de Chiapas)
- Buenaventura del Purísimo Corazón de María Portillo y Tejeda, O.F.M. (1880–1882), appointed Bishop of Chilapa, Guerrero
- Silvino Ramírez y Cuera (1921–1922)
- Alfredo Galindo Mendoza, M.Sp.S. (1948–1970)
- Juan Jesús Posadas Ocampo (1970–1982), appointed Bishop of Cuernavaca, Morelos; future Cardinal
- Emilio Carlos Berlie Belaunzarán (1983–1995), appointed Archbishop of Yucatán
- Rafael Romo Muñoz (1996–2016)
- Francisco Moreno Barrón (2016–2025)

=== Other priests of this diocese who became bishops ===
- Francisco Javier Chavolla Ramos, appointed Bishop of Matamoros, Tamaulipas in 1991
- Ramón Castro Castro, appointed Auxiliary Bishop of Yucatán in 2004

== See also ==
- List of Roman Catholic archdioceses in México

== External links and references ==
- "Archdiocese of Tijuana". Catholic-Hierarchy.
- Official Website of the Archdiocese: http://www.iglesiatijuana.org/
