= Neil Carpathios =

American poet

Neil Carpathios (born 1961 in Columbus, Ohio) is an American poet., professor, weekly newspaper columnist, and monthly radio program host. His poetry is known for vivid imagery and rich metaphors. His books include Beyond the Bones, At the Axis of Imponderables, Playground of Flesh, In the Womb of Kisses, and I the Father.

He currently teaches English and is the Coordinator of Creative Writing at Shawnee State University. His poetry column in The Portsmouth Daily Times is called "Let's Talk Poetry," in which he encourages the appreciation of poetry by showcasing work by local poets in the Southern Ohio region, where he now resides. Carpathios received his B.A. at Ohio State University in 1983 and attended the Iowa Writers' Workshop, where he received a M.F.A. in 1986. He also taught creative writing at Walsh University

== Books ==
- Beyond the Bones (2009; ISBN 0-578-03310-0)
- At the Axis of Imponderables (2007; ISBN 978-0-9743070-5-3)
- Playground of Flesh (2006; ISBN 1-59948-043-3)
- In the Womb of Kisses (2003)
- I the Father (1993)
