= Benny Alba =

American painter (born 1949)

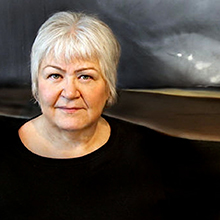
- Alba in 2015
- Born: May 7, 1949 (age 77); Columbus, Ohio
- Known for: Painting, printmaking
- Website: bennyalba.com

Benny Alba (born May 7, 1949) is an artist who lives in Oakland, California.

== Early life and career ==
Alba's great-grandmother was an oil painter and her grandmother trained as a concert pianist. Alba's mother, Marjorie, held a Master of Fine Arts degree in ceramics from Ohio State University, teaching at Ohio State University Academy. Alba's father, an engineer, was an inventor and CEO of Oasis (also known as Ebco), a Fortune 500 company. Art was an important topic in her childhood home.

During high school, Alba attended classes at Columbus Cultural Arts Center, part of the Columbus Parks and Recreation Department. Alba also studied at Penland School of Arts and Crafts summer program, attending lithography and silk screening classes.

After high school, Alba traveled with her mother to Europe, where they visited museums and architectural sites in Germany and Italy. Alba then began her studies at Kent State University, with a focus on English literature. While there she witnessed the shootings at Kent State, and soon after left university and her studies to live in Berkeley, California.

Six years later Alba enrolled in University of Michigan, earning a Bachelor of Psychology. During this period she began working in a studio on a daily basis, starting as an abstract painter. Alba regularly organized artist groups for figure drawing sessions for years, along with a consciousness-raising feminist group. She organized group exhibitions and began entering juried shows. In 1984 Alba moved back to the San Francisco Bay Area.

== Major painting series ==
Alba's earliest interest was in printmaking – linocuts, lithography, and etching. Painting as her primary focus started while attending University of Michigan as a Psychology major. Exploring abstraction and color fields, her work then moved to symbolism; a trend that continued for decades. Later on, Alba shifted to landscapes, with an increasing focus on the sky as the subject. Her work over these four decades can be categorized into several major bodies of work:

Old and New World (1980s) – A series of paintings and prints that speak to the intermingling – rather than homogenization – of US cultures, including an awareness of Native American rights, and the importance of Native American thoughts and beliefs regarding North America as well as feminism

Alaska Journey (2000s) – Landscapes sourced from a road trip through Canada to Alaska. This series marks the artist's shift from symbolism to landscape as an exclusive topic. The series includes paintings and prints.

Beauty, Thy Name is Night (installation, 2007 – 2010) – Oil paintings depicting night often exhibited in near total darkness. Quotes by notable authors and philosophers describing night above and below were written in white chalk on flat black painted drops installed on walls. Imagery included tree silhouettes and the moon in various stages of its monthly cycle. Viewers were supplied with flashlights to seek out the quotes.

American Storms (2010 – current) – These are oil paintings of extreme winter storm weather experienced by the artist while delivering solo shows cross-country. Painted on canvas or paper, a few are large format of 10 to 14 feet wide.

== Later career ==
Upon her move to California, Alba joined Apprentice Alliance, as master teacher/artist in the San Francisco-based organization training apprentices for more than three decades. Alba frequently donated workshops on photographing artworks for art groups. Alba has sponsored poetry readings and musical events at her art exhibitions in museum and gallery solo shows. A decades-long collaboration between poet Cynthia Harris and Alba included presentations together at Cody's Books in Berkeley, Jack London Square's Barnes & Noble Bookstore in Oakland, CA, as well as Alba's museum solo in Minnesota's North County Museum of Arts. For over 20 years, she hosted over two dozen guest artists as part of PRO ARTS East Bay Open Studios, an annual citywide public art event.

Alba has presented as a lecturer, served as a guest speaker, and juried multiple exhibits throughout her career. She also serves on the boards of several art-related organizations. Following her move to California, she joined the local branch of the Women's Caucus for the Arts. After being juried into The California Society of Printmakers, Alba rose from artist member to board member and finally served as President 2003 - 2006.

In 2010, the Oakland City Crafts and Cultural Arts Gallery held a retrospective of Alba's works. This made visible many of the artistic influences over Alba's career – including works influenced by abstraction, symbolism, psychology, anthropology, archaeology, surrealism, and feminism.

Alba remains active, with solo exhibitions, teaching apprentices, public speaking, jurying exhibitions and judging awards, as well as serving as guest speaker.

== Exhibitions ==
Alba's first group show was in Ohio at the Columbus Cultural Arts Center in 1980. Her first solo exhibition was the following year in the Loft Gallery at the same venue. Her first solo in California was in the Canessa Gallery in San Francisco. She has had over 100 solo exhibitions throughout the Commonwealth Club of California since then and participated in over 300 group shows in the US. Selected solo exhibitions include:

Hoyt Institute of Fine Art, New York

Las Vegas Art Museum, Las Vegas, Nevada

Maturango Museum, Ridgecrest, California

Oakland City Crafts and Cultural Arts Gallery, Oakland, California

Sedona Art Center, Sedona, Arizona

University of Mary, Welder Library, Bismarck, North Dakota

Valley Art Center, Clarkson, Washington

Western Wyoming Community College, Rock Springs, Wyoming

Alba's paintings and prints are held in public art collections, beginning with the acquisition of “Lost Blood: Ghost Dance” by the National Museum of Women in the Arts. Other collections include those of the Birmingham Museum of Art, Birmingham, Alabama; Greenpeace, San Francisco, California; Portland Art Museum, Gordon Gilkey Collection, Portland, Oregon; and Tyler Museum of Art, Tyler, Texas. “Far Away,” Alba's oil painting acquired by the Art in Embassies collection, Tashkent, Uzbekistan, is one of the rare Art in Embassies permanent purchases.

== Selected bibliography ==
2016 "California artist Benny Alba's series American Storms on display at Heritage Center", Devils Lake Journal, Chuck Wickenhofer, Devil's Lake, North Dakota.

2015 "Benny Alba 1969 - 2013" ISBN 978-0-578-15709-2, Publisher AlbaStudios, Oakland, California.

2014 Benny Alba, Alana Clearlake and Sarah Gordon Interviews. Hot Silica on Metal: The Art of Enameling. Maturango Museum, Ridgecrest, California

2010 “Alba Looks Back”, Contra Costa Times edition, San Jose Mercury News, Volume 99, #116, San Jose, California.

2009 “Painters with Fearless Brushes at Library Gallery”, The Orinda News, Elana O’Loskey, Orinda, California.

2004 “Limitless Possibilities”, Glass on Metal, volume 23, #4, Benny Alba, Bellevue, Kentucky. “Tools are Made but Born are Hands”, Glass on Metal, volume 23, #1, Benny Alba, Bellevue, Kentucky.

2002 “Full of Light, Full of Potential”, Inksmith, Benny Alba, spring edition Daniel Smith, Publisher, Seattle, Washington. “The Benefits of Archival Matting and Framing”, Inksmith, Daniel Smith Inks, Seattle, Washington.

2000 “Travels with Benny Alba”, The Arts Center Newsletter, January 2000, issue #22, Jamestown, North Dakota. “Two Artists Live in a House of Discards”, Red Rock News, Nancy Robb Dunst, Sedona, New Mexico.

1999 “Alba’s ‘Visions’ Now a Reality at EMU”, Oregon Daily Emerald, Sarah Lieberth, Eugene, Oregon.

1997 “Artist Creates Escape for Ordinary Folks”, Merced Times, Gateway, Diane Booth, Merced, California.

1994 “Artist Likes Colors Bright, Bizarre”, Las Vegas Sun, Las Vegas, Nevada.

1993 “And Benny Jumped Over the Moon”, Columbus Alive!, Columbus, Ohio. “Symbolism at Center of Alba’s Works”, Columbus Dispatch, Leslie Constable, Columbus, Ohio.

1990 “Alba’s Oils at Canessa Gallery”, San Francisco Arts Monthly, San Francisco, California. “Alba’s Show Blends Art and Poetry”, San Francisco Chronicle, San Francisco, California.
