= Deaths in December 2011 =

The following is a list of notable deaths in December 2011.

Entries for each day are listed alphabetically by surname. A typical entry lists information in the following sequence:

- Name, age, country of citizenship at birth, subsequent country of citizenship (if applicable), reason for notability, cause of death (if known), and reference.

== December 2011 ==
=== 1 ===
- Solomon Abera, 43, Eritrean journalist.
- Shingo Araki, 72, Japanese animation artist and character designer (Yu-Gi-Oh!, Galaxy Express 999).
- Eric Arnott, 82, British eye surgeon.
- Arthur Beetson, 66, Australian rugby league footballer, first Indigenous Australian to captain a national team in any sport, heart attack.
- Andrei Blaier, 78, Romanian film director and screenwriter, after long illness.
- Martina Davis-Correia, 44, American civil rights activist, breast cancer.
- Ragnhild Hveger, 90, Danish swimmer, Olympic silver medalist (1936).
- Ted Lapka, 91, American football player (Washington Redskins).
- François Lesage, 82, French embroidery designer.
- Bill McKinney, 80, American actor (Deliverance, The Outlaw Josey Wales, First Blood), esophageal cancer.
- Mr. Ebbo, 37, Tanzanian rapper, leukemia.
- Purificacion Quisumbing, 77, Filipino human rights advocate, Chairperson of Commission on Human Rights (2002–2008), multiple myeloma.
- Louis Silverstein, 92, American artist and graphic designer.
- Alan Sues, 85, American actor and comedian (Rowan & Martin's Laugh-In), heart attack.
- Hippolyte Van den Bosch, 85, Belgian footballer.
- Christa Wolf, 82, German writer.
- Elisabeth Young-Bruehl, 65, American psychoanalyst, biographer of Hannah Arendt, pulmonary embolism.

=== 2 ===
- Robert Lawrence Balzer, 99, American wine journalist.
- Bruno Bianchi, 56, French cartoonist and animator (Heathcliff and The Catillac Cats, Inspector Gadget).
- Laurent Fuahea, 84, Tongan-born Wallisian Roman Catholic prelate, Bishop of Wallis et Futuna (1974–2005).
- Pavle Jurina, 56, Croatian handball player and coach.
- Christopher Logue, 85, British poet.
- David Montgomery, 84, American historian, brain hemorrhage.
- Artur Quaresma, 94, Portuguese footballer.
- Patrick Sheridan, 89, American Roman Catholic prelate, Auxiliary Bishop of New York (1990–2001).
- Bill Tapia, 103, American ukulelist.
- Howard Tate, 72, American soul singer.

=== 3 ===
- Jalal Alamgir, 40, Bangladeshi academic, drowning.
- Dev Anand, 88, Indian actor, cardiac arrest.
- James A. Barclay, 88, Scottish Canadian engineer and executive, golfer, and golf historian, natural causes.
- Louky Bersianik, 81, Canadian novelist.
- Philip "Fatis" Burrell, 57, Jamaican record producer, stroke.
- Ernst-Jürgen Dreyer, 77, German writer.
- Sabri Godo, 82, Albanian politician, writer and scriptwriter, founder and president of the Republican Party of Albania, lung cancer.
- Karl-Axel Karlsson, 72, Swedish Olympic sport shooter (1972, 1976).
- Sam Loxton, 90, Australian cricketer (The Invincibles), Australian rules footballer and politician, Victorian MLA for Prahran (1955–1979).
- Larry Rickles, 41, American Emmy Award-winning producer (Mr. Warmth: The Don Rickles Project), pneumonia.
- Rafael Rodríguez Barrera, 74, Mexican politician, Governor of Campeche (1973–1979), President of the Institutional Revolutionary Party (1992–1993).
- Rob Schroeder, 85, American racing driver.

=== 4 ===
- Ahmed Haji Abdirahman, 54, Somali cleric, preacher, and Islamic scholar known for his contributions to Dawah, Assassinated by Al-Shabab.
- Mary Ellen Avery, 84, American pediatrician.
- Antonio Barone, 72, Italian physicist.
- Allan Cameron, 94, Scottish soldier and curler.
- Ambika Charan Choudhury, 81, Indian writer.
- Marion Dougherty, 88, American casting director (Full Metal Jacket, Batman, Midnight Cowboy).
- Patricia C. Dunn, 58, American businesswoman, Chairman of Hewlett-Packard (2005–2006), ovarian cancer.
- Adam Hanuszkiewicz, 87, Polish actor and theatre director.
- Matti Yrjänä Joensuu, 63, Finnish crime fiction writer.
- Besim Kabashi, 35, Albanian kickboxer, heart attack.
- Dimitrios Kalligeris, 62, Greek footballer (Panathinaikos F.C., Kalamata F.C.), traffic collision.
- Alamein Kopu, 68, New Zealand politician, List MP (1996–1999).
- Jim Malosky, 82, American football coach (Minnesota Duluth Bulldogs), respiratory failure.
- Sonia Pierre, 48, Dominican Republic human rights advocate, winner of Robert F. Kennedy Human Rights Award (2006), heart attack.
- RJ Rosales, 37, Filipino-born Australian singer and actor.
- Sócrates, 57, Brazilian footballer, septic shock.
- Hubert Sumlin, 80, American blues guitarist, heart failure.
- Andrei Tverdokhlebov, 71, Soviet dissident.

=== 5 ===
- Dan Biggers, 80, American actor (In the Heat of the Night, Glory, Elizabethtown).
- Michel Descombey, 81, French choreographer.
- Paul M. Doty, 91, American scientist.
- Tetsuzo Fuyushiba, 75, Japanese politician, Minister of Land, Infrastructure, Transport and Tourism (2006–2008), acute pneumonia.
- Peter Gethin, 71, British Formula One driver (1970–1974).
- Jorge Hourton, 85, French-born Chilean Roman Catholic prelate, Auxiliary Bishop of Temuco (1992–2001).
- Anatoly Klebanov, 59, Soviet Olympic water polo player.
- Gennady Logofet, 69, Russian footballer.
- Joe Lonnett, 84, American baseball player and coach.
- Dan Mills, 80, American animator (Family Guy, He-Man and the Masters of the Universe).
- Daisy Myers, 86, African-American educator.
- Pusuke, 26, Japanese dog, world's oldest known living dog at time of death.
- Bill Stits, 80, American football player (Detroit Lions, San Francisco 49ers, New York Giants), complications from Alzheimer's disease.
- Darrell K. Sweet, 77, American artist.
- Georges Talbourdet, 60, French cyclist.
- Violetta Villas, 73, Belgian-born Polish singer.
- Celia Whitelaw, Viscountess Whitelaw, 94, British ATS volunteer, philanthropist/charity worker and horticulturist.

=== 6 ===
- Günter Altner, 75, German interdisciplinary scientist.
- Giancarlo Badessi, 83, Italian actor, heart attack.
- John Banks, 89, American Negro league baseball player.
- Brent Darby, 30, American basketball player (Ohio State University), blood clots.
- Tony Fell, 79, British music publisher.
- Ron Fletcher, 90, American dancer and pilates teacher, heart failure.
- Dobie Gray, 71, American singer ("The 'In' Crowd", "Drift Away"), cancer.
- Barbara Orbison, 61, German-born American record producer and music publisher, pancreatic cancer.
- Paul Ramírez, 25, Venezuelan footballer, stroke.
- Lawrie Tierney, 52, Scottish footballer.

=== 7 ===
- Pearse Cahill, 95, Irish aviation pioneer.
- Peter Croker, 89, English footballer (Charlton Athletic).
- Teresa Hsu, 113, Chinese-born Singaporean social worker and supercentenarian.
- Tom Kennedy, 63, American film trailer producer.
- Nuno Viriato Tavares de Melo Egídio, 89, Portuguese general, Governor of Macau (1979–1981).
- Harry Morgan, 96, American actor (M*A*S*H, Dragnet, December Bride), pneumonia.
- Elizabeth Ann Ray, 98, American USAF officer.
- Jerry Robinson, 89, American comic book artist (Batman), co-creator of Robin and The Joker.
- T. A. Springer, 85, Dutch mathematician.

=== 8 ===
- Gilbert Adair, 66, Scottish author, film critic and journalist, brain haemorrhage.
- Mihai Botez, 89, Romanian Olympic gymnast.
- Peter Brown, 77, English footballer.
- Robert Brown, 61, American politician, Georgia State Senator (1991–2011), suicide by gunshot.
- Lewis Bush, 42, American football player (San Diego Chargers, Kansas City Chiefs), apparent heart attack.
- Sir Zelman Cowen, 92, Australian constitutional lawyer and academic, 19th Governor-General of Australia (1977–1982).
- Vinko Cuzzi, 72, Croatian footballer.
- Ladislas de Hoyos, 72, French journalist and news anchor (TF1).
- Đơn Dương, 54, Vietnamese-born American actor (We Were Soldiers), heart failure and brain hemorrhage.
- Gene Huff, 82, American politician, member of the Kentucky House of Representatives (1967–1971) and State Senator (1971–1994), lung disease.
- Peggy Makins, 95, British agony aunt.
- Giorgio Mariani, 65, Italian footballer.
- Minoru Miki, 81, Japanese composer.
- Andrew Pataki, 84, American Eastern Catholic hierarch, Bishop of Parma for Ruthenian (1984–1995) and Passaic for Ruthenian (1995–2007).
- Joe Restic, 85, American NCAA and CFL football coach (Harvard Crimson, Hamilton Tiger-Cats).
- Charles Ritcheson, 86, American historian and diplomat.
- Nakdimon Rogel, 86, Israeli journalist and broadcaster, author of the Nakdi Report.
- Anthony Harbord-Hamond, 11th Baron Suffield, 89, British soldier and aristocrat.

=== 9 ===
- Alf R. Bjercke, 90, Norwegian business magnate.
- Jacques Debary, 97, French actor.
- Pushpa Hans, 94, Indian playback singer and actress.
- Davida Karol, 94, Israeli actress.
- Hans Maršálek, 97, Austrian political activist, spy, detective and historian.
- João Pereira dos Santos, 93, Brazilian martial artist (Capoeira).
- Len Phillips, 89, English footballer (Portsmouth, England).
- Richard J. Rabbitt, 76, American politician, Speaker of the Missouri House of Representatives (1973–1977), heart failure.
- Roy Tattersall, 89, English Test cricketer.
- Myra Taylor, 94, American jazz singer.

=== 10 ===
- Cary D. Allred, 64, American politician, member of the North Carolina Senate (1980–1984) and North Carolina House of Representatives (1994–2009).
- Jean Baucus, 94, American author, historian and arts patron, mother of Max Baucus.
- Hamilton Bobby, 44, Indian footballer, heart attack.
- Alan D. B. Clarke, 89, British psychologist.
- John Gower, 70, American politician, member of the Wisconsin State Assembly (1973–1979).
- Vida Jerman, 72, Croatian actress, lung cancer.
- Albert Overhauser, 86, American physicist.
- Stephen Schlossberg, 90, American union leader.
- Ernst Specker, 91, Swiss mathematician (Kochen–Specker theorem).
- Frank Stephens, 98, Australian surgeon.

=== 11 ===
- Rodolfo Bottino, 52, Brazilian actor (Bambolê, Bebê a Bordo, O Homem do Futuro) and chef, pulmonary embolism.
- Phillip Cottrell, 43, British born New Zealand journalist (BBC Scotland, Radio New Zealand), assaulted.
- Mimi Darwish, 69, Egyptian Olympic footballer (1964).
- John Patrick Foley, 76, American Roman Catholic Cardinal and Grand Master Emeritus of the Equestrian Order of the Holy Sepulchre of Jerusalem, leukemia.
- Susan Gordon, 62, American child actress (The Five Pennies, My Three Sons, The Twilight Zone), thyroid cancer.
- J. Lynn Helms, 86, American Marine Corps officer, Administrator of the Federal Aviation Administration (1981–1984), cardiopulmonary failure and pneumonia.
- Mabel Holle, 91, American baseball player (AAGPBL).
- Hans Heinz Holz, 84, German Marxist philosopher.
- Harold Hopkins, 67, Australian actor (Don's Party, Gallipoli, Underbelly: A Tale of Two Cities), mesothelioma.
- Eric Howlett, 84, American inventor.
- Ke Yan, 82, Chinese poet and writer.
- Ahmed İhsan Kırımlı, 91, Turkish doctor, politician, poet and philanthropist.
- Leonida Lari, 62, Moldovan-born Romanian writer and politician, member of the Supreme Soviet (1989–1991) and Romanian Parliament (1992–2008), breast cancer.
- Mario Miranda, 85, Indian cartoonist.
- Bonnie Prudden, 97, American rock climber and physical fitness advocate.
- M. S. Reddy, 87, Indian film producer, long illness.

=== 12 ===
- Sunday Bada, 42, Nigerian Olympic sprinter, gold medalist (2000).
- Clyde Conner, 78, American football player (San Francisco 49ers).
- John Gardner, 94, British classical music composer.
- Heini Lohrer, 93, Swiss Olympic ice hockey player (1948).
- Alberto de Mendoza, 88, Argentine actor (Horror Express).
- Mălina Olinescu, 37, Romanian singer (Eurovision Song Contest 1998), suicide by jumping.
- Sir Robert Peliza, 91, Gibraltarian politician, Chief Minister (1969–1972).
- Bert Schneider, 78, American film and television producer (Easy Rider, Five Easy Pieces, The Monkees).
- Randy Stein, 58, American baseball player.
- Gene Summers, 83, American architect (McCormick Place), liver disease.

=== 13 ===
- David Allen, 74, Northern Irish politician, stroke.
- Nordine Amrani, 33, Belgian-Moroccan terrorist, suicide by gunshot.
- T. J. Bass, 79, American writer.
- Graham Brown, 87, American actor (Malcolm X, The Muppets Take Manhattan), pulmonary failure.
- Kabir Chowdhury, 88, Bangladeshi writer.
- Russell Hoban, 86, American writer.
- Park Tae-joon, 84, South Korean businessman, Prime Minister (2000), breathing difficulties.
- Klaus-Dieter Sieloff, 69, German footballer.
- Erica Wilson, 83, British-born American embroidery designer.

=== 14 ===
- Roy Ash, 93, American businessman and public official, Director of the Office of Management and Budget (1972–1975).
- Graham Booth, 71, British politician, Member of the European Parliament for South West England (2002–2008).
- Luigi Carpaneda, 86, Italian Olympic fencer, gold medalist (1956).
- Boris Chertok, 99, Soviet and Russian rocket designer.
- Pedro Febles, 53, Venezuelan footballer and manager. (Spanish)
- Karl-Heinrich von Groddeck, 75, German Olympic rower, gold medalist (1960).
- Thomas C. Kelly, 80, American Roman Catholic prelate, Archbishop of Louisville (1981–2007).
- Arthur King, 84, Canadian boxer.
- Carol Murphy, 79, American politician, member of the New Jersey General Assembly (1993–2002).
- Mark Francis Schmitt, 88, American Roman Catholic prelate, Bishop of Marquette (1978–1992).
- Don Sharp, 90, Australian-born British film director (Hammer horror).
- Joe Simon, 98, American comic book writer (Captain America, Fighting American, Prez).
- Billie Jo Spears, 73, American country music singer ("Blanket on the Ground"), cancer.
- George Whitman, 98, American bookstore proprietor (Shakespeare and Company), complications of a stroke.
- James A. Zimble, 78, American Navy officer, Surgeon General of the United States Navy (1987–1991).

=== 15 ===
- Eduardo Barreto, 57, Uruguayan comic book artist (Batman, Superman, Martian Manhunter).
- Emmett L. Bennett Jr., 93, American classicist whose cataloging of Linear B led to its decipherment.
- Bob Brookmeyer, 81, American jazz valve trombonist, cardiopulmonary arrest.
- Adriano Capuzzo, 84, Italian Olympic equestrian Adriano Capuzzo Bio, Stats, and Results | Olympics at Sports-Reference.com
- Andy Carey, 80, American baseball player (New York Yankees).
- Walter Giller, 84, German actor.
- Christopher Hitchens, 62, British writer (God Is Not Great) and commentator (Vanity Fair), esophageal cancer.
- Paula Hyman, 65, American professor of modern Jewish history (Yale University).
- Ricardo Ibarra, 61, Argentine Olympic rower (1972, 1976, 1984).
- Guy Ignolin, 75, French professional cyclist.
- Gadzhimurat Kamalov, 46, Russian journalist, shot.
- Herbert Kesel, 80, German Olympic rower.
- Nur Khan, 88, Pakistani air marshal, Chief of Air Staff (1965–1969) and Governor of West Pakistan (1969–1970).
- Frank X. McDermott, 87, American politician, President of the New Jersey Senate (1967–1973).
- James M. Quigley, 93, American politician, Representative from Pennsylvania (1955–1957; 1959–1961).
- Jason Richards, 35, New Zealand race car driver (V8 Supercars), adrenocortical carcinoma.
- Carmen Rupe, 75, New Zealand transsexual entertainer, kidney failure.
- Fevzi Şeker, 49, Turkish wrestler, heart attack.
- Mario Tovar González, 78, Mexican Olympic wrestler (1952–1968), respiratory complications.

=== 16 ===
- Ulf Aas, 92, Norwegian illustrator.
- Franghiz Ahmadova, 83, Azerbaijani operatic soprano and music teacher.
- Robert Easton, 81, American dialect coach and actor (Working Girl, Pete's Dragon, Star Trek VI: The Undiscovered Country).
- Dan Frazer, 90, American actor (Kojak, As the World Turns), cardiac arrest.
- Alice Glenn, 89, Irish politician, TD for Dublin Central (1981–1982; 1982–1987).
- Chubee Kagita, 54, Japanese politician, heart failure.
- Henry Kitchener, 3rd Earl Kitchener, 92, British soldier and aristocrat.
- Mark Kopytman, 82, Ukrainian-born Israeli composer.
- Bert Muhly, 88, American politician and academic, Mayor of Santa Cruz, California (1974–1975), heart failure.
- Patrick V. Murphy, 91, American police chief, New York City Police Commissioner (1970–1973), heart attack.
- Michele O'Callaghan, 48, American makeup artist, cancer.
- Shimshon Rozen, 59, Israeli air force officer, plane crash.
- Pae Ruha, 80, New Zealand Māori leader.
- Keith W. Wilcox, 90, American architect and politician, member of LDS priesthood.
- Nicol Williamson, 75, Scottish actor (Inadmissible Evidence, Spawn, Excalibur), esophageal cancer.

=== 17 ===
- Michael Gower Coleman, 72, South African Roman Catholic prelate, Bishop of Port Elizabeth (1986–2011).
- Eva Ekvall, 28, Venezuelan TV news anchor and model, Miss Venezuela 2000, breast cancer.
- Cesária Évora, 70, Cape Verdean singer, heart failure.
- Maurice Huggett, 66, English nightclub proprietor.
- Kim Jong Il, 69 or 70, North Korean Supreme Leader (1994–2011), heart attack.
- Harley Sewell, 80, American football player (Detroit Lions, Los Angeles Rams).
- Marian Wohlwender, 89, American AAGPBL baseball player.

=== 18 ===
- Doe Avedon, 86, American actress (The High and the Mighty) and model, pneumonia.
- Cor Bakker, 93, Dutch cyclist.
- Jean Boucher, 85, Canadian politician, Member of Parliament for Châteauguay—Huntingdon—Laprairie (1953–1958).
- Henry E. Catto Jr., 81, American public servant and diplomat, complications of leukemia.
- Jeremy Doyle, 28, Australian wheelchair basketball player, Paralympic gold medalist (2009), bladder cancer.
- Václav Havel, 75, Czech playwright and politician, President of Czechoslovakia (1989–1992) and the Czech Republic (1993–2003).
- Warren Hellman, 77, American investor, founder of Hardly Strictly Bluegrass festivals, complications from leukemia treatment.
- Evans Knowles, 97, Canadian politician, Member of Parliament for Norfolk (1957–1962).
- Ralph MacDonald, 67, American percussionist and songwriter, lung cancer.
- Ted Markland, 78, American actor (The High Chaparral, One Flew Over the Cuckoo's Nest, Another 48 Hrs.).
- Donald Neilson, 75, English serial killer.
- Vaso Radić, 88, Yugoslav/Bosnian politician, mayor of Sarajevo (1963-1965).
- John Rex, 86, South African-born British sociologist.
- Johnny Silvo, 75, British folk and blues singer.
- Brian Sparkes, 70, Canadian biochemist.
- Ronald Wolfe, 89, British television writer (The Rag Trade, On the Buses), complications from a fall.
- Marijan Žužej, 77, Croatian Olympic silver medal-winning (1956) water polo player.
- Lorenzo de Rodas, 81, Spanish-Mexican actor.

=== 19 ===
- George Athor, 49, South Sudanese rebel leader, shot.
- Thomas H. Campbell III, 79, American politician.
- Gerard Louis Goettel, 83, American senior judge of the District Court for the Southern District of New York.
- Luciano Magistrelli, 73, Italian Olympic footballer (1960), heart attack.
- Kathleen Malach, 85, American AAGPBL baseball player.
- Héctor Núñez, 75, Uruguayan footballer, after long illness.
- William G. Robinson, 85, American politician, member of the Massachusetts House of Representatives.
- Ron Smith, 70, American radio host (WBAL), pancreatic cancer.

=== 20 ===
- Robert Ader, 79, American psychologist, co-founder of psychoneuroimmunology.
- Hana Andronikova, 44, Czech writer and playwright, cancer.
- Sean Bonniwell, 71, American guitarist, singer and songwriter (The Music Machine), lung cancer.
- Howard P. Boyd, 97, American naturalist.
- Hugh Carless, 86, British diplomat and explorer.
- Jack Goldman, 90, American physicist, chief scientist at Xerox Corporation.
- Khalifa Kambi, 56, Gambian politician, Deputy Minister of Agriculture (since 2010).
- George Lundy, 64, American priest and academic, President of Wheeling Jesuit University (2000–2003), stroke.
- Yoshimitsu Morita, 61, Japanese film director (The Family Game), liver failure.
- Tushar Ranganath, 37, Indian film director (Gulama), heart attack.
- Barry Reckord, 85, Jamaican playwright.
- Leopold Unger, 89, Polish journalist.
- Kenchappa Varadaraj, 89, Indian Olympic footballer (1948).
- Václav Zítek, 79, Czech opera singer.

=== 21 ===
- Ann-Mari Adamsson, 77, Swedish actor.
- Patrick Bashford, 82, Polish-born British professor of classical guitar.
- Bud Bloomfield, 75, American baseball player.
- Francis Braganza, 89, Indian Roman Catholic prelate, Bishop of Baroda (1987–1997).
- John Chamberlain, 84, American sculptor.
- P. K. Iyengar, 80, Indian nuclear scientist.
- Alastair Maitland, 95, British diplomat.
- Werner Otto, 102, German entrepreneur (Otto GmbH).
- Olavi Rokka, 86, Finnish Olympic modern pentathlete, bronze medalist (1952).
- Yevhen Rudakov, 69, Russian Olympic bronze medal-winning (1972) football goalkeeper.
- Robert Simons, 89, English cricketer (Hertfordshire).
- Jonathan Stephenson, 61, English-born Northern Irish politician.
- Roberto Szidon, 70, Brazilian classical pianist, heart attack.
- Umanosuke Ueda, 71, Japanese professional wrestler and actor, respiratory failure.
- Jean-Pierre Urkia, 93, French-born Laotian Roman Catholic prelate, Vicar Apostolic of Paksé (1967–1975).
- Yuval Zamir, 48, Israeli actor, voice actor, director and singer, diabetes.

=== 22 ===
- Per Berlin, 90, Swedish Olympic silver (1952) and bronze (1956) medal-winning wrestler.
- Richard Bessière, 88, French author.
- Emanuel Bosák, 87, Czech sports official.
- Bettye Danoff, 88, American golfer, founding member of the LPGA.
- William Duell, 88, American singer and actor (1776, One Flew Over The Cuckoo's Nest, Police Squad!).
- Bennie Ellender, 86, American college football coach (Arkansas State, Tulane), Alzheimer's disease.
- Michael von Grünau, 67, Canadian psychologist and neurophysiologist.
- Vasant Ranjane, 74, Indian cricketer.
- Rogelio Sánchez González, 90, Mexican Roman Catholic prelate, Bishop of Colima (1972–1980).
- Marion Segal Freed, 77, American film producer, editor and screenwriter.
- Zithulele Sinqe, 48, South African Olympic long-distance runner, car accident.
- Ernest A. Watkinson, 99, Canadian politician.

=== 23 ===
- Merrill Kenneth Albert, 88, American author and trial lawyer, heart disease.
- Denise Darcel, 87, French actress, aneurysm.
- Neil Davids, 56, English footballer.
- Cees van Dongen, 79, Dutch motorcycle road racer.
- Evelyn Handler, 78, American academic, President of the University of New Hampshire (1980–1983) and Brandeis University (1983–1991), traffic collision.
- Bill Klatt, 64, American ice hockey player (Minnesota Fighting Saints), leukemia.
- Francis Nigel Lee, 77, British-born American theologian, motor neurone disease.
- Tripuraneni Maharadhi, 82, Indian screenwriter.
- Aydın Menderes, 65, Turkish politician, son of Adnan Menderes.
- Norayr Musheghyan, 76, Armenian wrestler, coach and public activist, world champion (1958).
- Abdur Razzaq, 69, Bangladeshi politician.
- Bruce Ruxton, 85, Australian veterans' representative and advocate, President of the Victorian RSL (1979–2002).
- Muhammad Afzal Zullah, 83, Pakistani jurist, Chief Justice (1990–1993).

=== 24 ===
- Monte Amundsen, 81, American opera and musical singer.
- M. Salah Baouendi, 74, Tunisian-born American mathematician.
- Armando Brambilla, 69, Italian Roman Catholic prelate, Auxiliary Bishop of Rome (since 1994).
- Sergio Buso, 61, Italian footballer and coach.
- Peggy R. Cook, 73, American politician.
- José Andrés Corral Arredondo, 65, Mexican Roman Catholic prelate, Bishop of Parral (since 1992), heart attack.
- Bernard Gert, 77, American philosopher.
- Johannes Heesters, 108, Dutch actor and singer, stroke.
- István Jutasi, 82, Hungarian Olympic sailor Olympedia – István Jutasi
- Marvin Knopp, 78, American mathematician.
- Zsuzsi Mary, 64, Hungarian pop singer, suicide by drug overdose.
- Jody Rainwater, 92, American bluegrass musician and radio personality, heart disease.
- John N. Ross, 91, Irish politician.
- Lynn Samuels, 69, American radio personality (SiriusXM).
- Walter Söhne, 98, German agronomist.
- Henri Sitek, 82, Polish-French cyclist.
- Vitaly Tseshkovsky, 67, Russian chess Grandmaster.

=== 25 ===
- Alhaj Mutalib Baig, Afghan politician, suicide bombing.
- Israel Baker, 92, American violinist and concertmaster, stroke.
- Giorgio Bocca, 91, Italian essayist and journalist.
- Ben Breedlove, 18, American Internet personality, cardiac arrest.
- Sue Carroll, 58, British journalist, pancreatic cancer.
- Adrienne Cooper, 65, American klezmer and Yiddish vocalist, adrenal cancer.
- Satyadev Dubey, 75, Indian actor, playwright and director.
- Thomas Finnegan, 86, Irish Roman Catholic prelate, Bishop of Killala (1987–2002).
- Seán French, 80, Irish politician, Lord Mayor of Cork (1976) and TD (1967–1982).
- Jack Fulbeck, 95, American poet and academic.
- Habib Galhia, 70, Tunisian boxer, Olympic bronze medalist (1964).
- Andrew Geller, 87, American architect, kidney failure.
- Lex Gigeroff, 49, Canadian writer, actor and producer (Lexx), heart attack.
- Khalil Ibrahim, 53–54, Sudanese Darfuri rebel leader, air strike.
- Sir Roger Jowell, 69, British social statistician.
- John Christoffel Kannemeyer, 72, South African writer, authority on Afrikaans literature.
- Christophe Laigneau, 46, French footballer (Stade Lavallois).
- Alexander Melnikov, 81, Soviet and Russian politician.
- Sir Moses Pitakaka, 66, Solomon Islander politician, Governor-General (1994–1999).
- George Robb, 85, English footballer (Tottenham Hotspur F.C.), dementia.
- Ferenc Schmidt, 70, Hungarian politician.
- Jim Sherwood, 69, American musician (The Mothers of Invention).
- Simms Taback, 79, American author, graphic artist and illustrator.

=== 26 ===
- Kennan Adeang, 69, Nauruan politician, President (1986).
- Houston Antwine, 72, American football player (Boston/New England Patriots, Philadelphia Eagles), AFL All-Star (1963–1968), heart failure.
- Pedro Armendáriz Jr., 71, Mexican actor (Zorro), cancer.
- Sarekoppa Bangarappa, 79, Indian politician, Chief Minister of Karnataka (1990–1992).
- Joe Bodolai, 63, American television writer (Saturday Night Live) and producer (The Kids in the Hall), suicide by poisoning.
- Sean Collins, 59, American surfer and surf forecaster (Surfline), heart attack.
- Fred Fono, 49, Solomon Islander politician, Deputy Prime Minister (2006) and MP for Central Kwara'ae (1997–2010).
- John Mackintosh Howie, 75, Scottish mathematician.
- Kiyonori Kikutake, 83, Japanese architect.
- Barbara Lea, 82, American jazz singer and actress, Alzheimer's disease.
- Lloyd Madden, 93, American football player (Chicago Cardinals).
- Sam Rivers, 88, American jazz musician and composer, pneumonia.
- James Rizzi, 61, American pop artist.
- Constantine Sidamon-Eristoff, 81, American-born Georgian aristocrat, New York City highway commissioner, esophageal cancer.

=== 27 ===
- Frank Bourke, 89, Australian football player.
- Catê, 38, Brazilian footballer, car accident.
- Sir Clifford Darling, 89, Bahamian politician, Governor-General (1992–1995).
- Sir Michael Dummett, 86, British philosopher.
- Helen Frankenthaler, 83, American artist.
- Julia Sampson Hayward, 77, American tennis player, won Australian Open doubles and mixed doubles (1963).
- Rusty Hevelin, 89, American science fiction fanzine publisher.
- Mykola Koltsov, 75, Russian-born Ukrainian footballer and youth trainer.
- Meral Menderes, 78, Turkish opera singer.
- Thinley Norbu, 81, Tibetan Buddhist writer and teacher.
- Sir Iwan Raikes, 90, British vice admiral and naval secretary.
- Betty Jane Rhodes, 90, American actress (The Arizona Raiders, Sweater Girl).
- Martino Scarafile, 84, Italian Roman Catholic prelate, Bishop of Castellaneta (1985–2003).
- Thomas Michael Shanahan, 77, American senior judge of the District Court for the District of Nebraska.
- Dan Terry, 87, American jazz trumpeter and big band leader.
- Anne Tyng, 91, American architect.
- Dennis Utter, 72, American politician, Nebraska State Senator (since 2009).
- Johnny Wilson, 82, Canadian ice hockey player and coach (Detroit Red Wings).

=== 28 ===
- James Earl Baumgartner, 68, American mathematician.
- Bruce Fine, 74, American sports team part-owner.
- Larry Hamilton, 60, American blues singer and songwriter.
- Charlotte Kerr, 84, German film director and producer.
- Razia Khan, 75, Bangladeshi writer and educationist.
- Don Mueller, 84, American baseball player (New York Giants, Chicago White Sox), MLB All-Star (1954, 1955).
- Hasan Mutlucan, 85, Turkish folk singer.
- Lucia Rikaki, 50, Greek stage, film and television director, cancer.
- Jon Roberts, 63, American drug trafficker, cancer.
- Myron Roderick, 77, American Olympic wrestler (1956) and coach.
- Kaye Stevens, 79, American singer and actress, breast cancer and blood clots.
- Teruo Sugihara, 74, Japanese golfer, prostate cancer.

=== 29 ===
- Ivan Andonov, 77, Bulgarian film director and actor.
- Paul Antaki, 84, Egyptian Melkite Catholic hierarch, Auxiliary Archbishop of Antioch (1968–2001).
- Rosman García, 32, Venezuelan baseball player (Texas Rangers), traffic collision.
- Leopold Hawelka, 100, Austrian coffee house owner (Café Hawelka).
- John Robert Holmes, 84, Canadian politician, MP for Lambton—Kent (1972–1980).
- Ron Howells, 84, Welsh footballer.
- Ken Johnson, 80, English footballer.
- Aamir Hayat Khan Rokhri, 55, Pakistani politician, heart attack.
- Svein Krøvel, 65, Norwegian cinematographer.
- Tyron Perez, 26, Filipino actor (StarStruck), shot.
- Amichand Rajbansi, 69, South African politician, Minister without portfolio (1984–1988), Leader of the Minority Front (since 1994).
- Bob Wasserman, 77, American police chief and politician, Mayor of Fremont, California (2004–2011), respiratory complications.
- Milton Wong, 72, Canadian businessman and philanthropist, pancreatic cancer.

=== 30 ===
- Ted Beard, 90, American baseball player (Pittsburgh Pirates, Chicago White Sox).
- Garnet Campbell, 84, Canadian curler.
- Mike Colalillo, 86, American soldier, Medal of Honor recipient.
- Dezső Garas, 77, Hungarian actor.
- Mona Guérin, 77, Haitian writer and playwright.
- Muhammad Hamidullah Khan, 74, Bangladeshi politician.
- Sir Robert Horton, 72, British businessman.
- Kim Geun-tae, 64, South Korean politician, Minister of Health and Welfare (2004–2006), pneumonia and kidney failure.
- Richard Lainhart, 58, American artist and composer, complications after surgery.
- Ricardo Legorreta, 80, Mexican architect, UIA Gold Medal recipient, cancer.
- Ronald Searle, 91, British cartoonist (St Trinian's School, Molesworth).
- Doug Sellars, 50, Canadian television executive (Fox Sports Media Group, CBC Sports), heart attack.
- Vasily Starodubtsev, 80, Russian politician, Governor of Tula Oblast (1997–2005), member of the Gang of Eight (1991).
- Eleanor Ross Taylor, 91, American poet.
- Mirko Tremaglia, 85, Italian politician, Minister without portfolio (2001–2006).
- Eva Zeisel, 105, Hungarian-born American ceramic artist and designer.

=== 31 ===
- Kanati Allen, 64, American Olympic gymnast.
- Murray Barnes, 57, Australian soccer player (Sydney Hakoah), national captain (1980–1981).
- Celia Dale, 99, British crime writer.
- Alfonso Gómez-Lobo, 71, Chilean-born American academic, professor of metaphysics and moral philosophy (Georgetown University).
- Roy Greenwood, 80, English footballer (Crystal Palace F.C.).
- Sir David Hirst, 86, British jurist.
- Rex Jackson, 83, Australian politician and convicted criminal, New South Wales MLA for Bulli (1955–1971) and Heathcote (1971–1986).
- Penny Jordan, 65, British romantic novelist.
- Jerzy Kluger, 90, Polish businessman, bronchitis.
- Stanley Kwan, 86, Hong Kong banker, creator of the Hang Seng Index, heart failure.
- Glenn Lord, 80, American editor.
- Michael Mann, 87, British Anglican prelate, Dean of Windsor (1976–1989).
