= Diocese of Ahmedabad =

Latin Catholic jurisdiction in India

Coordinates: 23.0307°N 72.5847°E

Diocese of Ahmedabad Dioecesis Ahmedabadensis अहमदाबाद के सूबा Hindi અમદાવાદ ડાયોસિઝ Gujarati

Location
- Country: India
- Ecclesiastical province: Gandhinagar

Statistics
- Area: 14,791 km^{2} (5,711 sq mi)
- Population: Total; Catholics: (as of 2014); 10,274,000; 71,800 (0.7%)
- Parishes: 45

Information
- Rite: Latin Church
- Established: 5 May 1949; 76 years ago
- Cathedral: Cathedral of Our Lady of Mount Carmel in Ahmedabad
- Patron saint: St Francis Xavier; Sacred Heart

Current leadership
- Pope: Leo XIV
- Bishop: Athanasius Rethna Swamy Swamiadian
- Metropolitan Archbishop: Thomas Ignatius MacWan

The Diocese of Ahmedabad (Latin: Ahmedabaden(sis)) is a Latin Church ecclesiastical territory or diocese of the Catholic Church in Indian. It is a suffragan in the ecclesiastical province of the metropolitan Archdiocese of Gandhinagar, yet depends on the Congregation for the Evangelization of Peoples.

Its cathedral is (Our Lady of) Mount Carmel Cathedral, in the city of Ahmedabad in Gujarat state, western India.

== Statistics ==
As of 2014, it pastorally served 71,800 Catholics (0.7% of 10,274,000 total) on 14,791 km² in 45 parishes and 2 missions with 164 priests (89 diocesan, 90 religious), 455 lay religious (130 brothers, 325 sisters) and 11 seminarians.

== History ==
- Established in 1934 as Mission sui iuris of Ahmedabad from the Metropolitan Archdiocese of Bombay
- Elevated on 5 May 1949 as Diocese of Ahmedabad / Ahmedabadensis (Latin adjective)
- Lost territory on 26 February 1977 to establish the Diocese of Rajkot
- Lost territory on 11 October 2002 to establish the Archdiocese of Gandhinagar, which became its Metropolitan.

== Prelates ==
Ecclesiastical superior of Ahmedabad

- Fr. Joaquin Vilallonga, SJ

Bishops of Ahmedabad

(all native Indians except the first)

- Edwin Pinto, Society of Jesus (Jesuits, S.J.) (born 1901 in present Pakistan, then also British India) (5 May 1949 – retired 1973), died 1978
- Charles Gomes, S.J. (1 July 1974 – 21 May 1990), died 2002
- Stanislaus Fernandes, S.J. (21 May 1990 – 11 November 2002), next Metropolitan Archbishop of Gandhinagar (India) (11 October 2002 – 12 June 2015), Apostolic Administrator sede plena of Diocese of Baroda (Gujarat, India) (23 May 2016 – ...)
- Thomas Ignatius MacWan (11 November 2002 – 12 June 2015), next Metropolitan Archbishop of above Gandhinagar (12 June 2015 – ...)
- Athanasius Rethna Swamy Swamiadian (29 January 2018 – ...).
