= Abera =

Abera is both a given name and a surname. Notable people with the name include:

- Gezahegne Abera (born 1978), Ethiopian long-distance runner
- Abera Kuma (born 1990), Ethiopian long-distance runner
- Loza Abera (born 1997), Ethiopian footballer
- Meskerem Abera (born 1989), Ethiopian activist and journalist
- Solomon Abera (1968–2011), Ethiopian journalist
- Tamirat Tola Abera (born 1991), Ethiopian long-distance runner
