= Diocese of Colima =

Roman Catholic diocese in Mexico

Coordinates: 19.2433°N 103.7280°W

Diocese of Colima Dioecesis Colimensis Diócesis de Colima
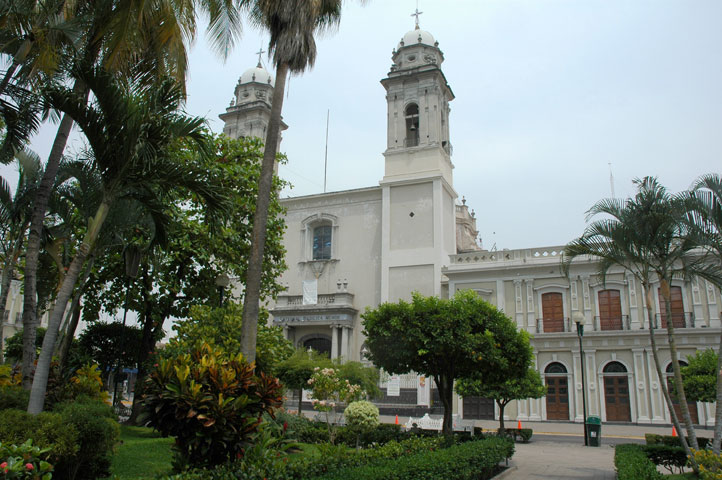
- Catedral Basílica de Nuestra Señora de Guadalupe

Location
- Country: Mexico
- Ecclesiastical province: Province of Guadalajara
- Metropolitan: Colima, Colima

Statistics
- Area: 4,399 sq mi (11,390 km^{2})
- Population: Total; Catholics: (as of 2006); 649,739; 591,262 (91%)
- Parishes: 52

Information
- Denomination: Roman Catholic
- Rite: Roman Rite
- Established: 11 December 1881 (143 years ago)
- Cathedral: Catedral Basílica de Nuestra Señora de Guadalupe

Current leadership
- Pope: Leo XIV
- Bishop: Gerardo Díaz Vázquez
- Metropolitan Archbishop: Francisco Robles Ortega
- Bishops emeritus: José Luis Amezcua Melgoza

Map
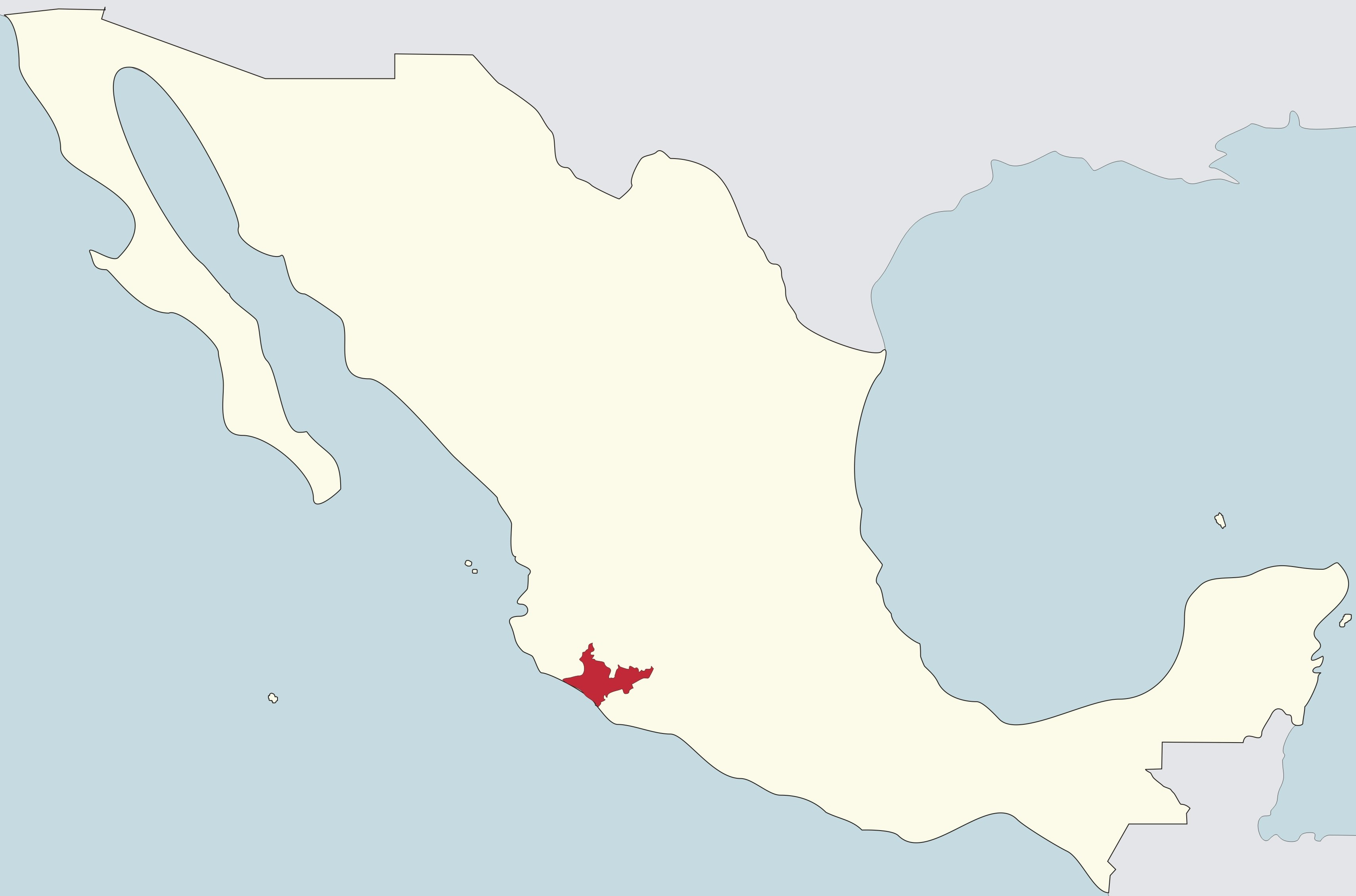

Website
- www.diocesisdecolima.org

The Roman Catholic Diocese of Colima (Latin: Dioecesis Colimensis) (erected 11 December 1881) is a suffragan diocese of the Archdiocese of Guadalajara.

On Monday, November 11, 2013, Pope Francis named Bishop Marcelino Hernández Rodríguez, then Bishop of the Roman Catholic Diocese of Orizaba (based in Orizaba, Mexico) as the Bishop of the Roman Catholic Diocese of Colima, replacing the Bishop José Luis Amezcua Melgoza, who submitted his resignation at the age of 75 as is usual.

== Territorial losses ==
Date	Reason
28 January 1961	to form the Diocese of Autlán
13 January 1962	to form the Territorial Prelature of Jesús María (del Nayar)
30 April 1962	to form the Diocese of Apatzingan
25 March 1972	to form the Diocese of Ciudad Guzmán
25 March 1972	to form the Diocese of San Juan de los Lagos

== Bishops ==
=== Ordinaries ===
- Francisco Melitón Vargas y Gutiérrez (1883–1888)
- Francisco de Paula Díaz y Montes (1889–1891)
- Atenógenes Silva y Álvarez Tostado (1892–1900)
- José Amador Velasco y Peña (1903–1949)
- Ignacio de Alba y Hernández (1949–1967)
- Leonardo Viera Contreras (1967–1972)
- Rogelio Sánchez González (1972–1980)
- José Fernández Arteaga (1980–1988)
- Gilberto Valbuena Sánchez (1989–2005)
- José Luis Amezcua Melgoza (2005–2013) – Bishop Emeritus
- Marcelino Hernández Rodríguez (2013–2022)
- Gerardo Díaz Vázquez (2023-present)

=== Coadjutor bishop ===
- Ignacio de Alba y Hernández (1939–1949)

=== Other priest of this diocese who became bishop ===
- Crispin Ojeda Márquez, appointed Auxiliary Bishop of México, Federal District in 2011

== Episcopal See ==
- Colima, Colima

== External links and references ==
- "Diocese of Colima". Catholic-Hierarchy.
