= Athanasius Rethna Swamy Swamiadian =

Roman Catholic bishop

Most Reverend Athanasius Rethna Swamy Swamiadian
- Bishop of Ahmedabad
- Archdiocese: Gandhinagar
- Diocese: Ahmedabad
- Appointed: 29 January 2018
- Predecessor: Thomas Ignatius MacWan
- Successor: Incumbent
- Previous posts: Rector of Vianney Vihar, Major Seminary, Vadodara

Orders
- Ordination: 29 March 1989 by Bishop Charles Gomes, S.J.
- Consecration: 14 April 2018 by Thomas Ignatius MacWan

Personal details
- Born: 10 February 1961 (age 65) Tamil Nadu India
- Denomination: Roman Catholic
- Education: Pontifical Gregorian University

Athanasius Rethna Swamy Swamiadian is the current serving bishop of the Roman Catholic Diocese of Ahmedabad, India.

== Early life and education ==
Swamy was born on 10 February 1961 at Tamil Nadu, India. He studied from St. Charles Major Seminary in Nagpur. He has also acquired a Licentiate in Clinical Psychology from the Pontifical Gregorian University.

== Priesthood ==
On 29 March 1989, Swamy was ordained a priest by Bishop Charles Gomes, S.J.

Date	Event	Title
10 Feb 1961	Born	
29 Mar 1989	Ordained priest	Priest of Ahmedabad, India
29 Jan 2018	Appointed	Bishop of Ahmedabad, India
14 Apr 2018	Ordained bishop	Bishop of Ahmedabad, India

== Episcopate ==
Swamy was appointed bishop of Ahmedabad on 29 January 2018 by Pope Francis and consecrated by Thomas Ignatius MacWan on 14 April 2018. Prior to his appointment he was serving as the rector of Vianney Vihar, Major Seminary in Vadodara.
