= Atenógenes Silva =

Archbishop of the Roman Catholic Church

His Excellence Atenógenes Silva y Álvarez Tostado
- Archbishop of Morelia 1900–1911
- Archdiocese: Morelia
- Province: Morelia
- See: Morelia
- Appointed: 31 August 1900
- Installed: 27 November 1900
- Term ended: 26 February 1911
- Predecessor: José Ignacio Árciga y Ruiz de Chávez
- Successor: Leopoldo Ruiz y Flores
- Previous post: Bishop of Colima 1892–1900

Orders
- Ordination: 30 November 1871
- Consecration: 9 October 1892

Personal details
- Born: 22 August 1848 Guadalajara, Jalisco, Mexico
- Died: 26 February 1911 (aged 62) Morelia, Michoacán
- Denomination: Roman Catholic
- Education: Pontifical Academy of Guadalajara

Styles of Atenógenes Silva y Álvarez Tostado
- Reference style: His Excellence
- Spoken style: Your Excellence

Atenógenes Silva y Álvarez Tostado (22 August 1848 – 26 February 1911) was a Mexican clergyman, Bishop of Colima (1892–1900), and Archbishop of Morelia (1900–1911).

== Biography ==
He was the son of Joaquín Silva (of Portuguese origin) and Ignacia Álvarez Tostado (born in Tlajomulco de Zúñiga). He was ordained a priest on 30 November 1871 in the Parish of the Sanctuary of Guadalajara. He obtained a doctorate in Theology from the Pontifical Academy of Guadalajara.

At twenty-five years of age, he was a priest in the Diocese of Ciudad Guzmán, where he founded an observatory. In 1880 he was appointed parish priest of the same diocese. In 1883, he was a prebendary in the Cathedral of Guadalajara, during his canonry he founded welfare homes and some other religious institutions. He was a professor at his alma mater.

In that archdiocese, he founded the hospital of the Congregation of the Sisters of the Sacred Heart and the Poor, also known as Hospital of the Sacred Heart of Jesus.

On 11 July 1892, Pope Leo XIII named him Bishop of Colima; on 9 October of the same year he was consecrated by the hands of Archbishop Pedro Loza y Pardavé. On August 21, 1900 he was named Archbishop of Morelia; in this archdiocese he founded schools which he provided with libraries and laboratories.

For his work he was known as the "Father of the Poor". He was decorated with the great cross of the Order of Isabella the Catholic. On 1 January 1900, he was elected a corresponding member of the Mexican Academy of Language. He died at the age of 62, on 26 February 1911, in Morelia.

Catholic Church titles
| Preceded by Francisco de Paula Díaz y Montes | Bishop of Colima; 1892 – 1900 | Succeeded by José Amador Velasco y Peña |
| Preceded by José Ignacio Árciga y Ruiz de Chávez | Archbishop of Morelia; 1900 – 1911 | Succeeded by Leopoldo Ruiz y Flores |
