= Charles Ramirez =

Gibraltarian guitarist

- Born: Charles Ramirez; 2 September 1953 (age 72); Gibraltar
- Genres: Classical music
- Occupations: Musician, Professor of Guitar at the Royal College of Music
- Instrument: Classical guitar
- Years active: 1974–present

Charles Ramirez (born 1953) is a Gibraltarian concert guitarist based in London. He is also Professor of guitar at the Royal College of Music.

== Biography ==
=== Early life ===
Charles Ramirez was born on 2 September 1953 in Gibraltar. He studied with William Gomez MBE (a student of Narciso Yepes) who gave him his first lessons and such was his aptitude that, just two months later, he gave his first performance live on local television (Gibraltar Broadcasting Corporation). He was a regular performer on Gibraltar television and radio prior to moving to London to study.

=== Royal College of Music ===
In 1971, Charles Ramirez entered the Royal College of Music as a student, where he studied guitar with Patrick Bashford and composition with Stephen Dodgson. Whilst at college, he won the Jack Morrison guitar prize. He was the first ever guitar student at the Royal College of Music to be invited to play with the full orchestra and he gave his first performance of Rodrigo's Aranjuez Concerto in June 1973. He became an Associate of the Royal College of Music (ARCM) in April 1974. Whilst still a student of the college he gave his debut at the Purcell Room.

Ramirez was appointed Professor of Guitar at the Royal College of Music in 1978 (age 25) and also teaches in the college's Junior Department. He was invited by Trinity College of Music to devise the syllabus for their international guitar grade examinations. This also led to the publication of his Technical Development for Guitarists that has been used by Trinity for over a decade.

Charles Ramirez organised a tribute to Segovia at the Royal College of Music in 1987 and performed alongside John Williams and Carlos Bonnell, where he played Rodrigo's 'Fantasy for a Gentleman', conducted by John Forster.

=== Performing career ===
Charles Ramirez made his professional debut on London’s South Bank while still a student and has since given many concerts and master classes both in Britain and abroad. He has broadcast regularly for Radio 3, his first programme being chosen for 'Pick of the Week'. He has a special interest in modern contemporary music and has given world premiers of several contemporary works, including 'Nick's Lament' by Erika Fox, 'Sonetos y Casidas del Amor Oscuro' by Jeremy Dale-Roberts (both commissioned with funds from the Arts Council of Great Britain), 'Shades V' by Naresh Sohal, 'Toccata" by John Lambert and 'Serenata for Guitar' by Jesus Eduardo Alvarez, which was dedicated to him.

=== Duo ===
Charles Ramirez and Helen Kalamuniak (a student of John Williams) formed a Guitar duo in 1974. They premiered their transcription of Bach's Goldberg Variations at the Purcell Room in 1975. BBC Radio 3 later broadcast a live performance with a studio audience. The duo went on to premiere Charles Ramirez' transcription M de Falla's ballet 'El Amor Brujo', also broadcast on BBC Radio 3. Andrés Segovia on one of his annual visits to London asked the Duo to give a private performance of the Goldberg Variations.

=== Instrument ===
Charles plays a guitar made for him by Jose Romanillos (1973, Semley).

=== Recordings ===
Charles Ramirez signed an exclusive recording contract in January 2010.

=== Personal life ===
Charles Ramirez met his wife Helen Kalamuniak at the RCM and married in 1975. They have three children and two grandchildren.
