= Sparkes =

Sparkes is a surname. Notable people with the surname include:

- Ali Sparkes (born 1966), British children's author
- Allan Sparkes (born 1958), Australian policeman, recipient of the Cross of Valour
- Andrew Sparkes (born 1959), British ambassador to Nepal
- Bernie Sparkes (born 1940), Canadian curler
- Brian Sparkes (1941–2011), Canadian biochemist
- George Sparkes (1845–1908), English cricketer
- Gordon Sparkes, Canadian curler
- Grace M. Sparkes (1893-1963(, American booster
- Harold Sparkes (1896–1917), English footballer
- Herbert Sparkes (1859–1923), British politician, MP for Tiverton
- Irwin Sparkes, lead singer of English pop/rock band The Hoosiers
- John Charles Lewis Sparkes (c.1833–1907), British art educator
- John Sparkes (born 1954), Welsh comedian
- Leonora Sparkes (1883–unknown), British opera singer
- Lindsay Sparkes (née Lindsay Davie) (born 1950), Canadian curler
- Reginald F. Sparkes (1906–1990), Canadian educator, author and politician
- Sir Robert Sparkes (1929–2006), Australian politician
- Sydney Sparkes Orr, Professor of Philosophy at the University of Tasmania

== Fictional characters ==
- Lizzie, Joe, and Hannah Sparkes, supporting characters in the animated series Fireman Sam (named for John Sparkes)

== See also ==
- Sparke
- Spark (disambiguation)
