= Leopoldo Ruiz y Flóres =

Mexican prelate

- Archbishop of Morelia
- Church: Catholic Church
- Archdiocese: Archdiocese of Morelia
- In office: 27 November 1911 – 12 December 1941
- Predecessor: Atenógenes Silva
- Successor: Luis María Altamirano y Bulnes
- Previous posts: Archbishop of Linares o Nuevo León (1907-1911); Bishop of León (1900-1907)

Orders
- Ordination: 17 March 1888
- Consecration: 27 December 1900 by Próspero Alarcón y Sánchez de la Barquera

Personal details
- Born: 13 November 1865 Amealco de Bonfil, Department of Querétaro, Second Mexican Empire (French Empire)
- Died: 12 December 1941 (aged 76) Morelia, Michoacán, Mexico

Leopoldo Ruiz y Flóres (13 November 1865 – 12 December 1941) was a Mexican prelate of the Catholic Church who served as Archbishop of Morelia from 1911 until his death in 1941. He was previously Bishop of Léon from 1900 to 1907 and Archbishop of Linares o Nueva León from 1907 to 1911.

During the Church-state negotiations following the Cristero War, he represented the Holy See as its Apostolic Delegate to Mexico. He was later sent into exile in 1932 in reprisal for Pope Pius XI's sharp critique of the Mexican government, but returned in 1938 after resigning his diplomatic post.

== Biography ==
Leopoldo Ruiz y Flóres was born on 13 November 1865 in Amealco de Bonfil, Mexico. He was ordained a priest on 17 March 1888.

On 12 November 1900, Pope Leo XIII appointed him Bishop of Léon. He received his episcopal consecration on 27 December 1900. On 14 September 1907, Pope named him Archbishop of Linares o Nueva León. On 27 November 1911, Pope Pius X named him Archbishop of Michoacán. (The name of that archdiocese changed to the Archdiocese of Morelia on 22 November 1924.)

He was appointed Apostolic Delegate to Mexico on 10 October 1929 by Pope Pius XI. The Cristero War, a rebellion against the government's suppression of the Catholic Church, was ending, but years of conflict about its resolution followed. In his new role, Ruiz led the Mexican bishops into alignment with Pope Pius, who opposed the rebellion but struggled with the government's ongoing anti-clericalism. Ruiz represented the Church in difficult negotiations with the government while following instructions and pronouncements from Rome.

The situation worsened when Pope Pius issued an encyclical, Acerba animi on 29 September 1932 that denounced the Mexican government for reneging on earlier agreements. Ruiz had always been a moderate in tone and posture, but as the Vatican's representative became the target of the government's response. On 3 October 1932, the Chamber of Deputies voted him into exile. He based himself nearby in San Antonio, Texas. Under pressure from Rome, he resigned as apostolic delegate and returned to Mexico in 1938. (Note: The date of his resignation is unclear, but it made his return to Mexico in 1938 uncontroversial. The quasi-official of the diplomatic corps of the Holy See dates it to 1937.) He was still Archbishop of Morelia when he died on 12 December 1941 at the age of 76.
