= Ciudad Guzmán Cathedral =

Coordinates: 19.703764°N 103.463112°W

St. Joseph Cathedral
- Catedral de San José
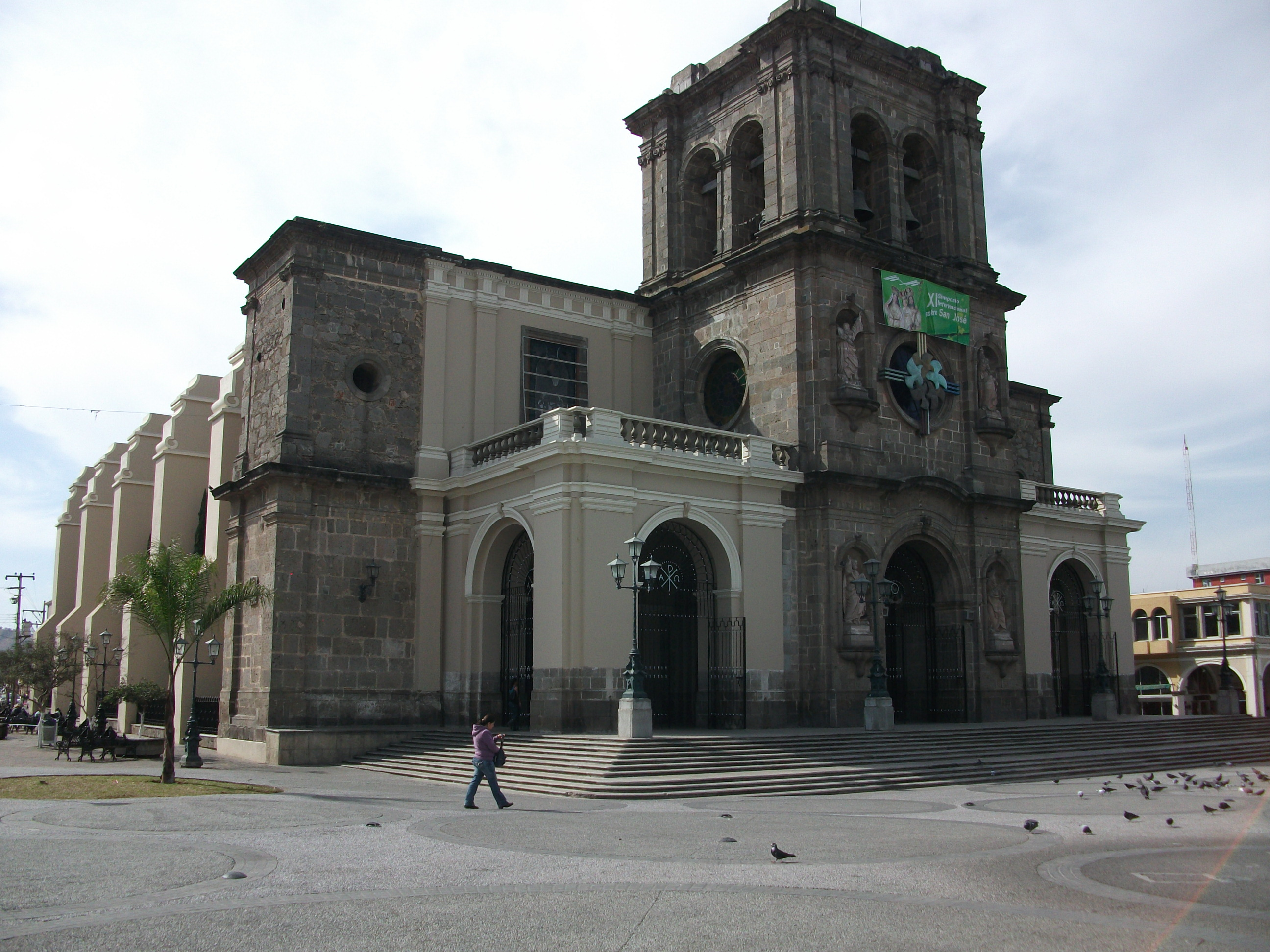
- St. Joseph Cathedral
- Location: Ciudad Guzmán
- Country: Mexico
- Denomination: Roman Catholic Church

Administration
- Diocese: Roman Catholic Diocese of Ciudad Guzmán

Clergy
- Bishop: Braulio Rafael León Villegas

The St. Joseph Cathedral (Spanish: Catedral de San José) Also Ciudad Guzmán Cathedral It is a Catholic cathedral in Mexico that serves as the mother church of the Roman Catholic Diocese of Ciudad Guzmán and the seat of its bishop. Built at the end of the 19th century, it was completed around 1900.

The current cathedral was built in 1866. The first stone was laid on May 27, 1866, by the then parish priest, Antonio Zuniga Ibarra. It was consecrated on October 8, 1900.

== See also ==
- Roman Catholicism in Mexico
- St. Joseph's Cathedral

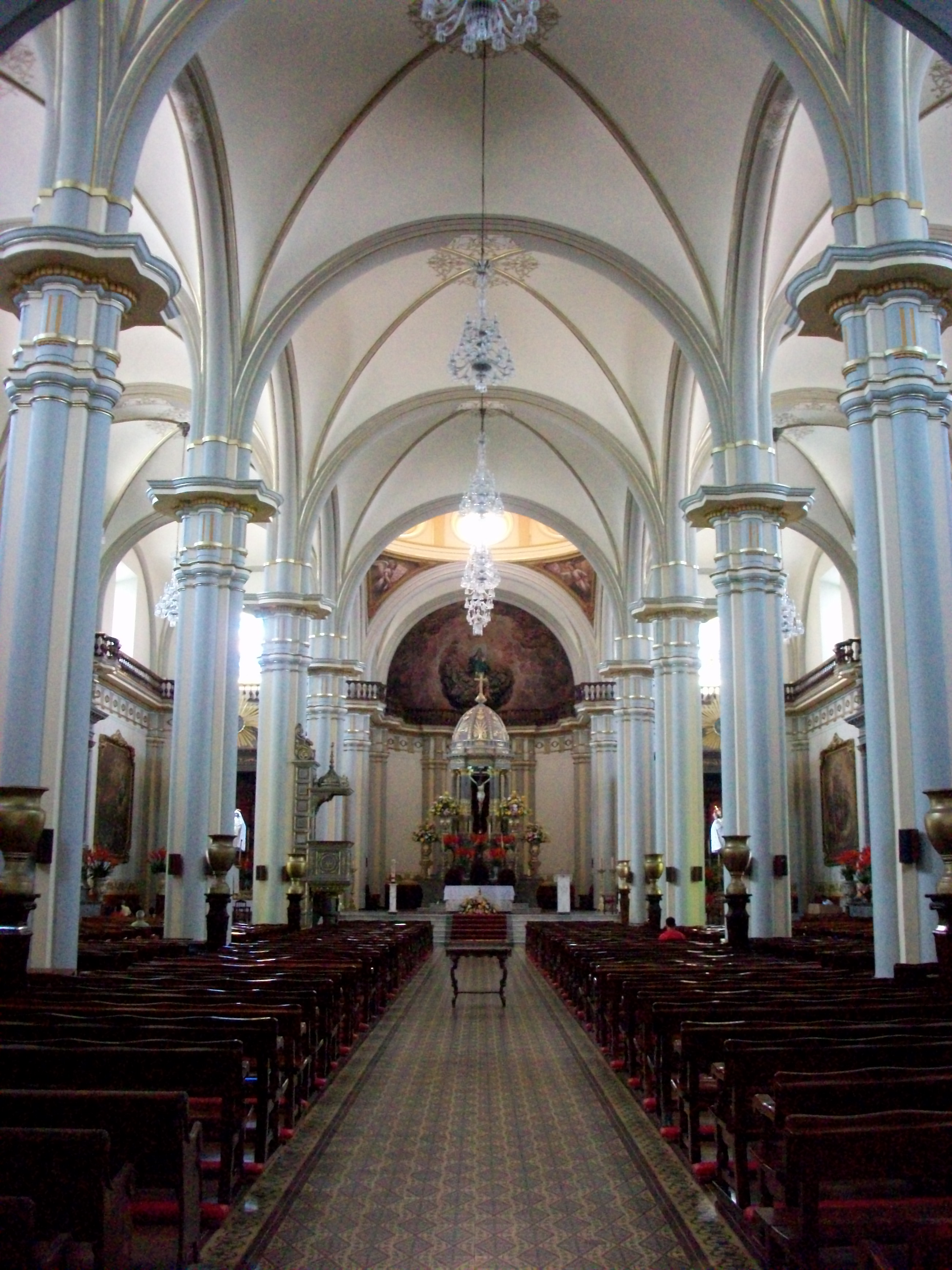
Internal view
