= People's Congress Party =

Solomon Islands political party

The People's Congress Party was a political party in Solomon Islands. It was founded by outgoing deputy Prime Minister Fred Fono during the campaign for the 2010 general election.

Upon first announcing the priorities of the party, Fono stated its focus would be on "anti-corruption measures, such as reforming the controversial rural constituency development funds, and on creating jobs for Solomon Islanders". During the campaign, he said that it would "treat infrastructure as its priority", such as the development of roads in the country. He pointed to his own Central Kwara'ae constituency, arguing that he had achieved an improvement in water supplies and health care services. The party would also "create incentives to stimulate economic activities in the rural areas", with an aim to "double the export of cocoa, copra, fish and sawn timber". On the debate over the possibility of creating reserved seats for women in Parliament, he stated that they were unnecessary, and that parties should, instead, field women candidates so as to bring them into the political mainstream; he pointed out that his party would be fielding six women candidates in the election. However, he said he would support a maximum of four reserved seats, if women standing against men were unsuccessful in the 2010 election.

The party would go on to win one seat in 2010 with 0.7% of the total vote.
