= Francis Braganza =

Bishop of Baroda, Gujarat, India

The Most Reverend Francis Braganza SJ
- Bishop Emeritus of Baroda
- Church: Roman Catholic Church
- Archdiocese: Archdiocese of Gandhinagar
- Province: Gandhinagar
- Metropolis: Gandhinagar
- Diocese: Diocese of Baroda
- See: Diocese of Baroda (emeritus)
- Installed: 29 August 1997
- Term ended: 21 December 2011
- Predecessor: Ignatius Salvador D'Souza
- Successor: Godfrey de Rozario
- Other post: Bishop of Baroda.^{(1987-1997)}
- Previous posts: Bishop of Baroda.^{(1987-1997)} Vice Provincial of Gujarat.^{(1963-1968)} Assistant to the General.^{(1967-1970)}

Orders
- Ordination: 21 November 1951
- Consecration: 29 June 1987 by Archbishop Simon Pimenta
- Rank: Bishop-Priest

Personal details
- Born: Francis Leo Braganza; 29 January 1922 Bandra, Bombay.
- Died: 21 December 2011 (aged 89) Xavier’s residence, Ahmedabad
- Buried: The Rosary Church, Baroda; 22.3181°N 73.1839°E
- Denomination: Roman Catholic
- Residence: Ahmedabad, India
- Parents: Leo Braganza^{(Father)} Sophia Braganza^{(Mother)}
- Education: Columbia University

Styles of Ferdinand Joseph Fonseca
- Reference style: Bishop
- Spoken style: Your Excellency
- Religious style: The Most Reverend

Ordination history of Francis Braganza
History
Episcopal consecration
- Principal consecrator: Archbishop Simon Ignatius Pimenta
- Co-consecrators: Bishop Charles Gomes, S.J., Bishop Gregory Karotemprel.

Francis Leo Braganza (29 January 1922 – 21 December 2011) was an Indian Jesuit priest. He was the bishop of the diocese of Baroda, Gujarat, from 1987 to 1997.

Francis Braganza was born in Mumbai, India, ordained a priest on 21 November 1951 in the Society of Jesus. Braganza was appointed bishop to the Diocese of Baroda on 27 April 1987 and ordained bishop 29 June 1987. Braganza retired on 29 August 1997. He lived in Ahmedabad, Gujarat, India, where he died in 2011, aged 89.

== See also ==
- Diocese of Baroda
- Society of Jesus
