= Sparke =

Sparke is a surname. Notable people with the surname include:

- Arthur Sparke, lawyer and politician
- Bowyer Sparke, bishop
- Edward Sparke, clergyman
- John Sparke (died 1566) English MP for Plympton Erle
- John Sparke (died 1640) English MP for Mitchell
- John Sparke (died 1680) English MP for Plymouth
- Joseph Sparke, antiquary
- Linda Sparke, astronomer
- Penny Sparke, writer and academic
- Philip Sparke, composer
- Thomas Sparke, clergyman
- Thomas Sparke (bishop)

== See also ==
- Spark (disambiguation)
- Sparkes
