= Jackson Fiulaua =

Solomon Islands politician (born 1957)

The Right Honourable Jackson Fiulaua MP
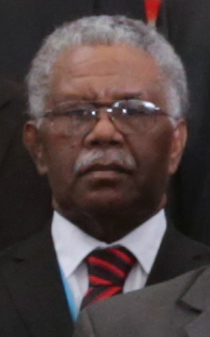
- Jackson Fiulaua poses for an official photo as part of the delegation led by Solomon Islands Prime Minister Manasseh Sogavare (26 September 2017) in Taipei, Taiwan.

Minister for Infrastructure and Development
- In office 27 August 2010 – 28 February 2012
- Prime Minister: Danny Philip (until 16 November 2011); then Gordon Darcy Lilo
- Succeeded by: Seth Gukuna

Member of Parliament for Central Kwara'ae
- Incumbent
- Assumed office 4 August 2010
- Preceded by: Fred Fono

Personal details
- Born: October 13, 1957 (age 68)
- Party: Independent

Jackson Fiulaua (born October 13, 1957 in Raiako, Malaita) is a Solomon Islands politician.

== Biography ==
After a primary school education, Fiulaua began working as a builder. He was later described as "a successful businessman who runs one of the top local construction companies in the country".

He began his political career when he was elected MP for Central Kwara'ae in the August 2010 general election. His election was described as "the major upset" in the election, as he unseated incumbent deputy Prime Minister Fred Fono, who had held the seat for twelve years. Fiulaua's election also provoked "numerous debates" due to his reportedly being "unable to read and write". Elected as an independent, Fiulaua declined to join any political party, but did join Prime Minister Danny Philip's coalition government, as Minister for Infrastructure and Development. When Gordon Darcy Lilo replaced Philip as Prime Minister in November 2011, Fiulaua retained his position in government.

On 28 February 2012, Fiulaua was sacked from the government for what Lilo described as a lack of performance. Leader of the Opposition Dr. Derek Sikua described the sacking as "grossly unfair". On that occasion, Fiulaua's "limited educational background" was mentioned anew, and downplayed by his supporters.
