= Legal Rights Observatory =

Organisation allegedly affiliated to Rashtriya Swayamsevak Sangh (RSS)

The Legal Rights Observatory (LRO) is a legal rights organisation allegedly affiliated with the Hindu nationalist organization Rashtriya Swayamsevak Sangh. It is led by Vinay Joshi, a former RSS worker. According to Joshi, the group consists of 150 volunteers, and he takes all decisions about filing legal petitions on behalf of the group. Joshi denies the group's connection to the RSS. The group is particularly active in Northeastern India.

== Legal complaints ==
The LRO has filed several legal complaints against media organisations. In April 2017, the LRO threatened the India Today TV channel with a police complaint for inviting human rights activist Nandini Sundar to a debate about India's Maoist insurgency; Sundar had previously published a book on the subject. The LRO described Sundar as a Naxal worker. In October 2017, the LRO objected to the 9th Anuradha Gandhi Memorial Lecture, commemorating the wife of jailed Naxal leader Kobad Ghandy, describing it as an anti-national event. The event concluded peacefully, amid raised concerns among the organisers and the police. Following the introduction of the Citizenship Amendment Bill 2016 in the Indian parliament, the LRO filed a complaint with the Home Ministry against four media organisations opposing the bill. The LRO alleged that the organisations were participating in illegal financial transactions and other criminal activities, and stated that the Home Ministry had initiated an inquiry following its complaint. The Home Ministry stated that it had not begun an inquiry, but had passed the complaint to the government of Assam.

The LRO has also filed several legal complaints against the Catholic Church. In August 2017, the LRO sent a letter to Pope Francis through the Holy See ambassador in Delhi, demanding an immediate apology from the Pope for discrimination and persecution, which they alleged the Church was committing against local tribes in north-east India. In November 2017, before the Gujarat Assembly elections, the LRO lodged a complaint against the Archbishop of Gandhinagar, Thomas Ignatius MacWan. When the Election Commission of India received the LRO complaint, it served a notice to the archbishop asking for clarification. MacWad had written to his constituents, asking them to pray for politicians who would "remain faithful to the Indian Constitution and save the country from nationalist forces". In 2017, Joshi complained to the National Commission for Protection of Child Rights, alleging that two missionary schools were forcing their children to participate in protests against the funeral of the leader of an indigenous faith. A Christian group in Meghalaya accused the LRO of harassing Christians by filing complaints and court suits against several Christian leaders.
