= Julian Moti =

Solomon Islands attorney general (1965–2020)

Julian Ronald Moti, QC, CSI (2 June 1965 - 21 December 2020) was the Attorney General of the Solomon Islands. He was born in the Colony of Fiji and educated in Australia.

Moti worked as an adjunct professor of law at Bond University on Australia's Gold Coast from 1992, and taught comparative constitutional law, public and private international law, transnational litigation and arbitration, international trade, and finance and investment in Australasia and the Pacific.

He was the founding president of the Pacific Islands Branch of the International Law Association (ILA), served on the ILA Committee on Compensation for Victims of War and has been a visiting professorial fellow at the Centre for Law and Governance at Jawaharlal Nehru University in New Delhi, India, and a visiting professor at Gujarat National Law University in Gandhinagar, Gujarat, India.

== Controversial allegation of child sex offence ==
Moti, an Australian citizen, had been wanted in Australia for serious alleged overseas child sex offences. He had been at the centre of an international dispute following efforts by the Australian Government to extradite him from both Papua New Guinea and the Solomon Islands to face charges in relation to an incident alleged to have taken place in Vanuatu in 1997. The proceedings involved a number of distinguished visiting judges: John von Doussa, now the president of Australia's Human Rights and Equal Opportunity Commission, Bruce Robertson, the president of the New Zealand Law Commission, and Daniel Fatiaki, former Chief Justice of Fiji.

The Australian lawyer, journalist and biographer David Marr cites that the original charges against Moti had been thrown out of court and considerable legal costs were ordered to be paid as the magistrate ruled that he had no case to answer, although he also quotes suggestions that the magistrate was corrupt. The magistrate in question, denies the accusation in an affidavit. Marr also, however, points out numerous "serious weaknesses" in the case against Mr Moti, including

six disturbing statements [the complainant] made over ... four months. All are in English, though it appears she only spoke French. None was in her own writing. None was sworn. The underlying story doesn't change from statement to statement, but details are contradictory. Others appear fanciful. She claimed he had three testicles, but Port Vila GP Dr Frank Spooner would later examine Moti and concluded he had two.... Dates are changed; at one stage she withdrew her allegations entirely, then renewed them a few weeks later saying her previous statement was 'not of my own free will' and asked police to investigate. In several statements she described being beaten and raped by Moti but in others that she loved him. 'I wanted to say that I love Julian Moti very much,' she stated in March 1998. 'He is a reach [rich] man he can take me anywhere I wanted and this is my belief of my future with Julian because he is so kind....'

In October 2008, The Australian Newspaper reported that Vanuatu magistrate Bruce Kalotiti, who heard the case against Moti in 1999, had been bribed by Moti to dismiss the case in exchange for Moti's paying for Kalotiti to study at the University of Western Sydney. The report cited university records and evidence obtained by the Australian Federal Police in September 2004. Kalotiti resigned from the bench as a result of the allegations and the evidence which supported them, gathered at the request of the Government of Vanuatu.

== Escape from Papua New Guinea to the Solomon Islands ==
After his arrest in Papua New Guinea in September 2006, Moti was released on bail pending an extradition hearing, but went into hiding in the Solomon Islands High Commission in Port Moresby. (He later claimed that his life had been threatened, and so sought sanctuary.)

The Papua New Guinea and Solomon Islands Governments denied knowledge of his whereabouts, but on 10 October 2006, he was secretly flown aboard a Papua New Guinea Defence Force aircraft to the Solomon Islands, where he was arrested by officers of RAMSI on his arrival in Munda, Western Province. When he left PNG, Moti was in breach of the bail conditions imposed by Madam Justice Catherine Davani of the National Court of Papua New Guinea, and had failed to appear at a PNG court hearing on 30 September. The PNG Government declined to say who in the Papua New Guinea Defence Force or Government had given the order to fly Moti out. In response, the Australian Government immediately cancelled planned visits by the PNG Prime Minister, Grand Chief the Right Honourable Sir Michael Somare, and Defence Minister Martin Aini, and postponed the annual Australia-PNG Ministerial Forum, and called for an investigation into the flight and prosecution of whoever was responsible. A PNG Defence Force Board of Inquiry into the escape had since recommended that Sir Michael Somare and a number of his advisers be charged with offences in relation to the escape, including breaching PNG's constitution. Somare had sought to suppress the Inquiry's report, challenging the Inquiry's standing in PNG's National Court. As yet the Court had not ruled on the validity of Somare's challenge to the public release of the Commission of Inquiry's findings, with the presiding judge likening Somare's attempts to suppress the findings of the report as a scandal on par with Watergate.

The Howard government in Canberra insisted that in its pursuit of Moti there is no political agenda with respect to ongoing issues between it and the Solomon's government of Manasseh Sogavare, while Prime Minister Sogavare insisted that Moti's arrest constituted a violation of the Solomon Islands' national sovereignty, and Mr Moti himself has described the charges as a politically motivated "witch-hunt".

Sogavare faced much criticism from the former Howard government for his refusal to allow the extradition of Moti. Sogavare and Sir Michael Somare stated that they considered that the Australian Government were politically persecuting Moti and that a new trial was uncalled for as the issue was "unconditionally concluded in Vanuatu in 1999" and the Australian government had failed to produce any new evidence to justify an extradition.

On 10 July 2007, the then-Prime Minister Sogavare appointed Moti as Attorney General of the Solomon Islands. The Government of SI subsequently sent 666 questions to Australian Director of Public Prosecutions, Damian Bugg QC, regarding the affair. The 666 questions can now be read online.

== Extradition from the Solomon Islands to Australia ==
In December 2007, Solomon Islands Prime Minister Sogavare was toppled in a vote of no confidence. It has been suggested that Sogavare's refusal to extradite Moti was the main cause of the Prime Minister's downfall. Opposition leader Fred Fono promised in November that Mr Moti would be extradited if the opposition came to power. The Fiji Times suggested that Mr Moti might then flee to Fiji. After Derek Sikua was elected prime minister later in December, he said that Mr Moti would be deported to Australia.

On 24 December, it was reported that Moti's position as attorney general had been terminated by the Sikua government, and that he faced a deportation order. Moti appealed unsuccessfully to the Solomon Islands High Court to halt the extradition process.

Prime Minister Sir Michael Somare of Papua New Guinea at this point has reportedly "threatened local media with contempt of court over their calls for the official release of the PNG Defence Force Inquiry report that recommends he faces charges" and Somare reportedly does not now support Mr Moti. It does not yet reliably appear that any untoward payment has been made to Somare for his alleged part in Moti's passage through Papua New Guinea.

On 27 December, Mr Moti was extradited to Australia and was arrested on arrival. On 4 January 2008 Moti was granted bail, set at A$100,000, with the conditions that he report to police daily, reside with his parents, and, surrender his passport, (travel documents) within 7 days, matter to be heard again on 15 February 2008. On 14 March 2008, Moti's lawyers asked for more time to prepare for his committal hearing, with the matter adjourned by the Court until April.

On 2 January 2008, former prime minister Manasseh Sogavare stated that Moti's extradition had violated a Magistrate's Court order which had aimed at halting the extradition process while Julian Moti's asylum application was processed. Sogavare said the arrest and extradition were "an example of the continuing disregard of the laws of Solomon Islands", and claimed that they demonstrated a "desire to control" on the part of RAMSI's Australian Federal Police and the Royal Solomon Islands Police.

Later that month, the Solomon Islands government declared Moti to be a "prohibited immigrant", and explained that he would not be allowed back into the Solomon Islands (for as long as the Sikua government remained in office), irrespective of whether or not his name is cleared in Australia.

== Stay of indictment ==
On 15 December 2009 Justice Debra Mullins of the Queensland Supreme Court ruled that there had been an abuse of process and stayed the indictment against Moti. She held that "questions about the integrity of the administration of the Australian justice system [arise] when witnesses who live in a foreign country, expected to be fully supported by the Australian Government until they gave evidence at the trial in Australia." The stay was set aside by the Queensland Court of Appeal in June 2010.

In December 2011, the High Court of Australia ordered a stay of charges, ruling that Australian officials' participation in Moti's extradition from the Solomon Islands had been unlawful under Solomon Islands law. Summarising its ruling, the court said: "Further prosecution of the charges would be an abuse of process because of the role that Australian officials in Mr Moti being deported to Australia". This was a permanent stay of prosecution putting an end to all court proceedings against Moti; the ruling was a majority decision of six judges to one. Manasseh Sogavare stated, in response to the ruling: "I am so pleased. This matter has hung like a dark cloud over me and my government. This decision has vindicated me".

Mr Moti regained his Fijian citizenship in 2012. He was admitted as a legal practitioner in Fiji on Monday 24 June 2013. In September, he was appointed Professor of Law at the University of Fiji.
