= Nakdi Report =

Document outlining the ethical guidelines of Israel's broadcasting industry

The Nakdi Report (Hebrew: מסמך נקדי, Mismach Nakdi ) is a document outlining the ethical guidelines of Israel's broadcasting industry.

== History ==
The Nakdi Report was published in 1995 as the Guidelines for Coverage of News and Current Affairs. It is named for its author, Nakdimon Rogel.

Patterned after the BBC’s Editorial Guidelines (previously, the Producer Guidelines), the document consists of 161 clauses and contains a comprehensive code of ethics and practice for journalists working within the IBA. It is also applied to journalists in private broadcasting, though it is not legally binding. Since it was drawn up in 1972, the document has been revised four times - in 1979, 1985, 1995 and 1998 - and expanded to four times its original size.

== Fairness and legal challenges ==
It is one of the few national ethics codes to retain a version of the Fairness Doctrine. This is in addition to notions of impartiality drawn from similar European codes, which require the Authority itself to refrain from broadcasting editorials. Fairness, however, goes beyond mere impartiality: in order to "ensure the public’s right to receive full and reliable information alongside balanced and varied opinions", journalists are required to "solicit opposing opinion, fairly notify the public if comment was refused, and avoid becoming 'tools of response' for 'professional reaction teams.'"

The requirements to ensure varied opinion - repeated elsewhere in the document as an enjoinder "that the pool of commentators must be varied", has caused several notable lawsuits to be filed against the IBA. Three in the 1980s were particularly notable: the first was against the landmark 1981 television miniseries The Pillar of Fire. Brought by a group of Israelis of Sephardic descent who felt that the dramatised history of Zionism unfairly minimised their communities' contribution to the movement, the Supreme Court indicated that in this case fairness was "irrelevant"; broadcast could not be censored, but "another aspect of the issue should be presented". In 1982, a decision by the IBA to ban interviews with any supporters of the Palestinian Liberation Organisation in the West Bank and Gaza was struck down; this case was the making of the now-legendary civil rights lawyer Amnon Zichroni. And in 1984, Rabbi Meir Kahane submitted that a similar ban on broadcasting his political statements be struck down. In a much-studied ruling that recognised racist speech was also protected speech, the High Court of Justice attempted to curtail the Zichroni vs IBA somewhat: Kach was permitted a "right of reply" if its positions were misrepresented, but it could not demand that its platform be broadcast, and nor could it demand the right of reply to criticism.

After the 1996 revision appeared, a study by Yitzhak Roeh, a media studies academic at HUJI called it an "anachronism" and "irrelevant" Since then, right-wing groups have frequently used the Nakdi Document as a basis for documentation of what they see as media bias; the two most high-profile incidents have been litigation surrounding the broadcast of Avishai Raviv's "swearing-in ceremony" with Eyal at Baruch Goldstein's grave, and the campaign to get rid of Gabi Gazit, whom they saw as serially breaking "the policies of public radio".

Although at least one study has concluded that rather than being responses to political stimuli, the various revisions of the Document have resulted in a "crystallization and implementation of normative ethical guidelines for Israeli public broadcasting", criticism that the Document contains at least some inherent bias continues to be leveled. Recently, concern that the language expected of the Israeli media was not sufficiently neutral included the complaint that the phrase "East Jerusalem" were prohibited by the guidelines.

There were also concerns that the report was not detailed enough. After Ariel Sharon's incapacitation, its ability to provide guidance balance between the private matter of his health and the public's right to know was found wanting. Similarly, the strictures against "melodrama" in factual broadcasting and against filming of funerals contrary to a family's wishes have been problematic: "Sterile coverage of terrorist attacks and bereavement will not get across the dimension we need to get - the emotional dimension," according to a television executive quoted in Ha'aretz.
