= Mr. Ebbo =

- Born: May 26, 1974
- Died: December 1, 2011 (aged 37)
- Citizenship: Tanzania
- Occupations: Rapper; Singer

Abel Loshilaa Motika (26 May 1974 – 1 December 2011 in Arusha), known for his stage name Mr. Ebbo, was a Masai hip hop musician from Tanzania.

== Biography ==
Mr Ebbo was one of the pioneering bongo Flava artistes. He rose to national fame with his single "Mimi Mmasai" in early 2000s. His other hits include "Bado" and "Kamongo". Most of his recordings were made at Motika Studios in Tanga. He performed in traditional Masai costumes.

In 2003 he was named to head a government campaign endorsing privatisation, for which he composed the song "Ubinaf-sishaji" (privatisation).

He died of leukemia on 1 December 2011 at Mission Usa River Hospital in Arusha. He left a widow with two daughters.

== Albums ==
- Fahari Yako (2002)
- Bado (2003)
- Kazi Gani (2004)
- Alibamu (2005)
- Kamongo (2006)
