= Nakdimon Rogel =

Israeli journalist

- נקדימון רוגל
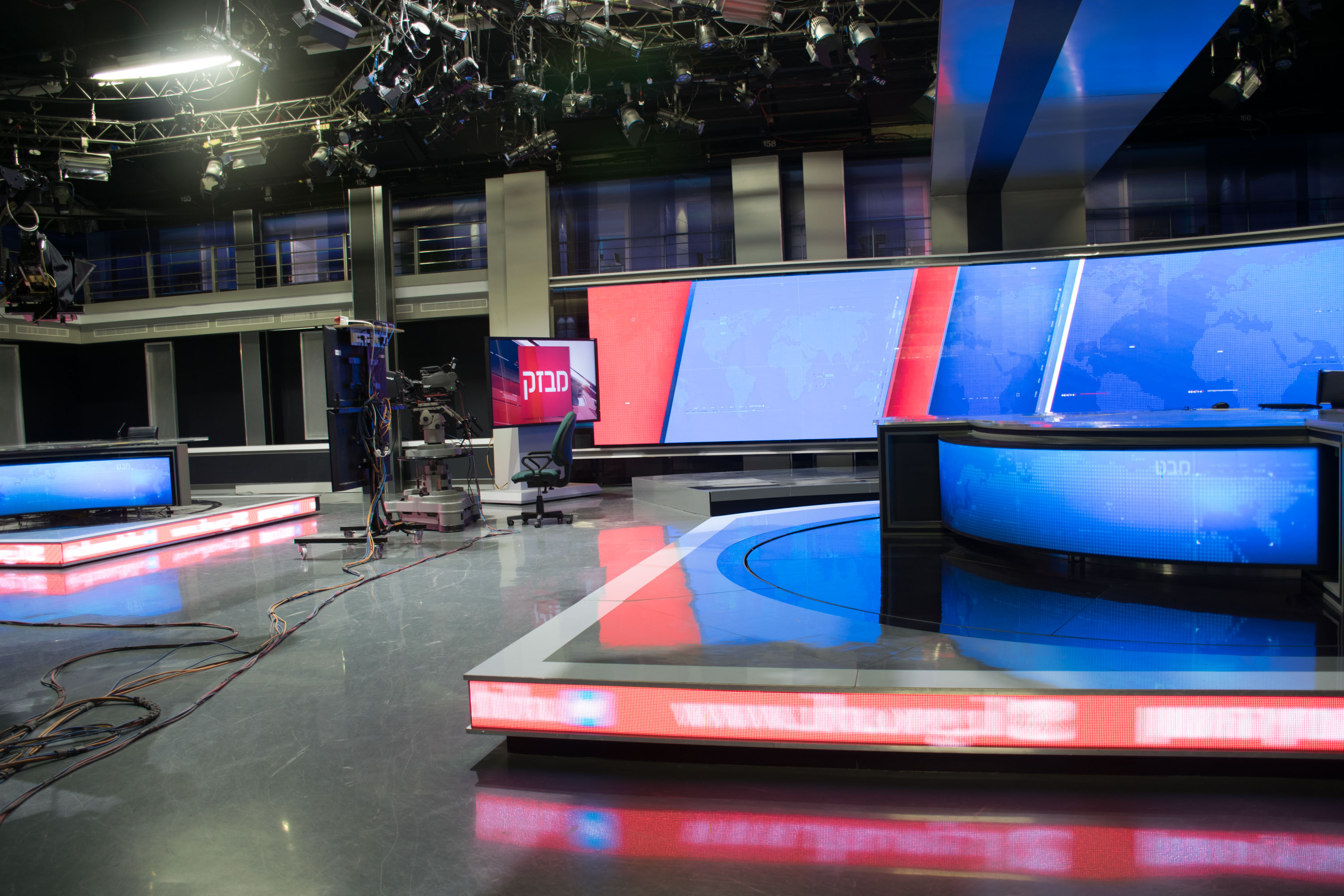
- IBA's Channel 1 TV "Nakdi Studio" Honoring and named after Nakdimon Rogel
- Born: 1925
- Died: 8 December 2011 (aged 85–86)
- Occupations: Journalist, Broadcaster
- Employer: Israel Broadcasting Authority (IBA)
- Known for: Pioneer of Israeli television, Author of the Nakdi Report

Nakdimon Rogel (Hebrew: נקדימון רוגל; 1925-8 December 2011) was an Israeli journalist, broadcaster and pioneer of Israeli television. Rogel authored the Nakdi Report (Mismach Nakdi), which acts as the ethical guideline for the Israeli broadcasting industry.

Nakdimon Rogel began his career as a journalist for Al Hamishmar newspaper. He switched to Israel Radio in the early 1950s, where he founded a department to train radio journalists. He also worked as Israel Radio's foreign correspondent based in Paris, and co-hosted a treasure hunt program with Yitzhak Shimoni.

Rogel spearheaded efforts to establish the radio and television headquarters for the Israel Broadcasting Authority in Romema, a neighborhood in Jerusalem. He served as the head of the development arm of Israel Broadcasting Authority (IBA) and a former CEO of Channel 1 when the channel was called ITV.

Nakdimon Rogel died at his home in Kfar Saba, Israel, on December 8, 2011, at the age of 86.

== See also ==
- Television in Israel
