= Kalifa Kambi =

Gambian politician

Kalifa Kambi (May 1955 – 20 December 2011) was a member of the African Union's Pan-African Parliament from Gambia. He was the Deputy Minister of Agriculture.

Kambi represented Kiang West in the National Assembly from his election in 2002 to 2007.
