= Meskerem Abera =

Ethiopian activist and journalist (born 1989)

- መስከረም አበራ
- Born: 1989 (age 36–37); Dangila, Gojjam, Ethiopia
- Education: Addis Ababa University (BA, MA)
- Occupations: Political activist; journalist
- Known for: Founder of Ethio Nikat Media

Meskerem Abera (Amharic: መስከረም አበራ; born 1989) is an Ethiopian activist and journalist who has been subjected to arbitrary arrest and detention by Abiy Ahmed administration. She has been arrested in April 2023 for alleged terrorism conviction and charged in June.

In November 2024, Meskerem's sentence was commuted from one year to four months.

== Biography ==
=== Early life and education ===
Meskerem Abera was born in 1989 in Dangila town in Gojjam. She completed her elementary, secondary school educations at Dangla, earning her BA in history and historical management and her MA in Development Studies from Addis Ababa University. Meskerem served in different capacities, such as the an instructor at Hawassa Teachers College at Hawassa University. At the college, she was known for conducting research on socio-economics matters.

=== Journalism and activism ===
Meskerem is a journalist and activist, and the founder of a YouTube channel called Ethio Nikat Media. In April 2023, she was detained in Addis Ababa for alleged "inciting violence and rioting" and charged with terrorism in June. In May, she joined a hunger strike what the detainees described a political persecution. Meskerem was one of the Committee to Protect Journalists. According to the Amhara Association of America, she has been guilty for alleged computer crimes according to her lawyer who spoke to BBC.

On 25 November 2024, the federal court commuted Meskerem's sentence from one year to four months.
