= Central Kwara'ae constituency =

Solomon Islands Parliament constituency

Central Kwara'ae
- Constituency for the Solomon Islands
- Region: Malaita Province

Current constituency
- Created: 1993
- Party: Independent
- Member(s): Jackson Fiulaua

Central Kwara'ae is a parliamentary constituency electing one representative to the National Parliament of Solomon Islands. It had a registered electorate of 8,977 in 2006, and 9,955 in 2010. It is one of fourteen constituencies in Malaita Province.

The constituency was established for the Fifth Parliament in 1993, and its first MP was Alfred Maetia. Fred Fono won the seat in 1997, and was twice re-elected, ultimately becoming deputy Prime Minister in 2007. He stood for a fourth term in 2010, but was unseated by political newcomer and independent candidate Jackson Fiulaua, in what was described as "the major upset" of the election. Fiulaua then became Minister for Infrastructure and Development in Danny Philip's government.

== List of MPs ==
The following MPs have represented Central Kwara'ae in the National Parliament.

Election	MP	Party
1993	Alfred Maetia	
1997	Fred Fono	
2001	Fred Fono	
2006	Fred Fono	
2010	Jackson Fiulaua	Independent

== Election results ==
=== 2010 ===
In the 2010 general election, there were eleven candidates for the seat, including nine independents, incumbent Fred Fono for the newly formed People's Congress Party, and Philip Akote'e for OUR Party. Akote'e finished third, ahead of eight independents, with 331 votes. Fono was second, with 2,379 votes, while Fiulaua took the seat with 2,936. The turnout rate was 67%.

Candidate	Party	Votes	%
Jackson Fiulaua	Independent	2,936	43.83
Fred Fono	People's Congress Party	2,379	35.51
Philip Akote'e	Ownership, Unity and Responsibility Party	331	4.94
Reubin Moli	Independent	251	3.75
Colin Sigimanu	Independent	232	3.46
John To'ofilu	Independent	215	3.21
Rosie Anilabata	Independent	121	1.81
Fred Maetoloa	Solomon Islands Liberal Party	77	1.15
Walton Abuito'o	Independent	72	1.07
Clement Lee	Independent	56	0.84
Leonard Sasai	Independent	29	0.43
Total		6,699	100.00
Source: SIBC
