= Diocese of Baroda =

Roman Catholic diocese in Gujarat, India

Coordinates: 22.3180°N 73.1839°E

Diocese of Baroda Dioecesis Barodensis

Location
- Country: India
- Ecclesiastical province: Gandhinagar
- Metropolitan: Gandhinagar

Statistics
- Area: 40,365 km^{2} (15,585 sq mi)
- Population: Total; Catholics: (as of 2022); 24,160,000; 101,000 (0.4%)
- Parishes: 49

Information
- Denomination: Catholic Church
- Sui iuris church: Latin Church
- Rite: Roman Rite
- Established: 29 September 1966; 59 years ago
- Cathedral: Cathedral of Our Lady of the Rosary in Vadodara
- Secular priests: 201 (50 Diocesan, 151 Religious Orders)

Current leadership
- Pope: Leo XIV
- Bishop: Sebastião Mascarenhas, S.F.X.
- Metropolitan Archbishop: Thomas Ignatius MacWan
- Bishops emeritus: Godfrey de Rozario, S.J.

The Roman Catholic Diocese of Baroda (Latin: Baroden(sis)) is a diocese located in the city of Baroda in the ecclesiastical province of Gandhinagar in India.

== History ==
- 29 September 1966: Established as the Diocese of Baroda from the Metropolitan Archdiocese of Bombay

== Leadership ==
Bishops of Baroda (Latin Rite)

- Ignatius Salvador D’Souza (29 September 1966 – 19 January 1986)
- Francis Leo Braganza, S.J. (27 April 1987 – 29 August 1997), retired
- Godfrey de Rozario, S.J. (29 August 1997 – 18 December 2021), retired
  - Apostolic Administrator Stanislaus Fernandes, S.J. (23 May 2016 – 18 February 2023), Archbishop Emeritus of Gandhinagar
- Sebastião Mascarenhas, S.F.X. (31 December 2022 – Present)
