= Cathedral Basilica of Colima =

Cathedral Basilica of Our Lady of Guadalupe
- Catedral Basílica de Nuestra Señora de Guadalupe
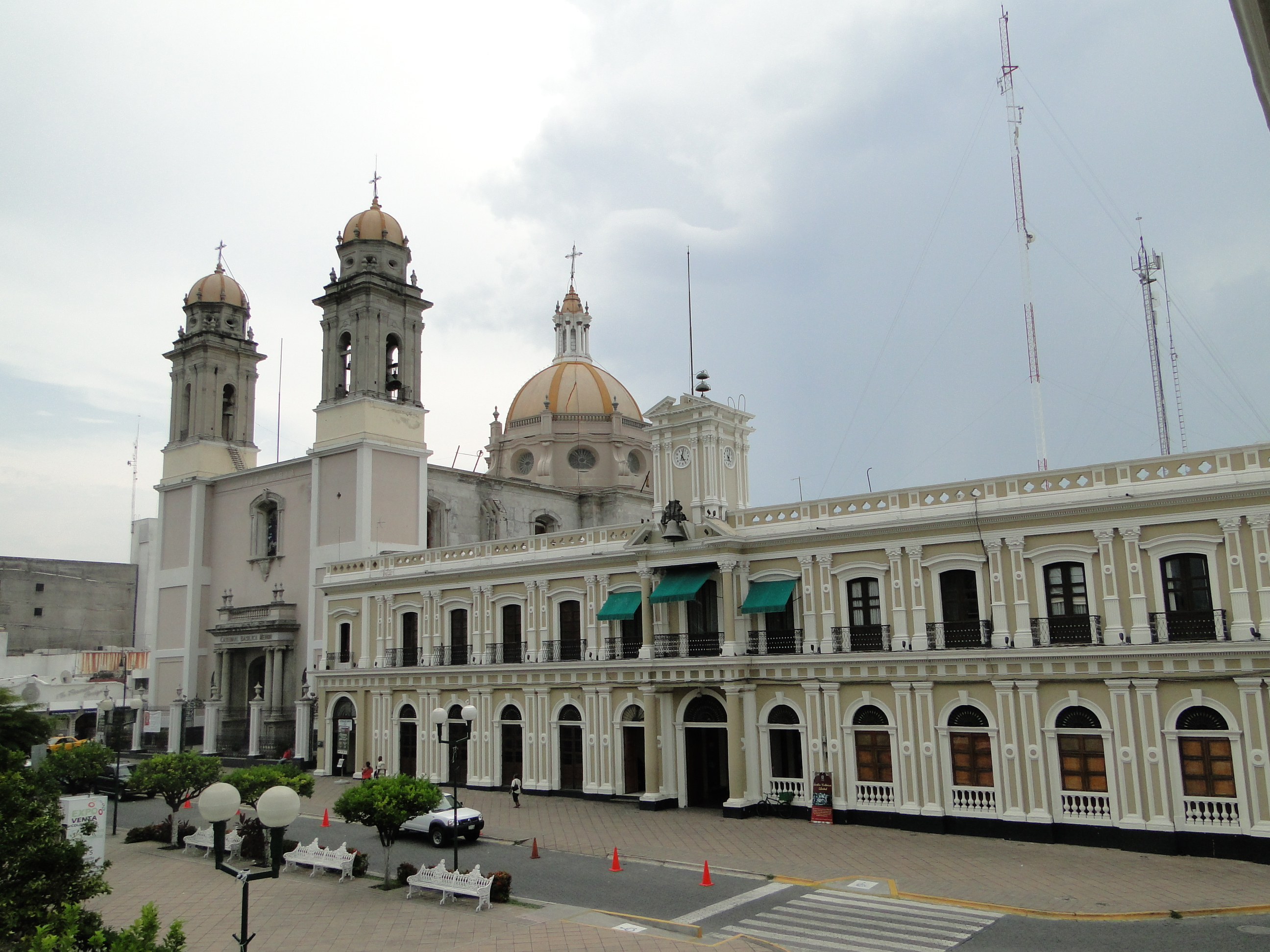
- Cathedral Basilica (left) and City Hall (right) of Colima
- Cathedral Basilica of Our Lady of Guadalupe
- 19°14′35″N 103°43′40″W
- Location: Colima
- Country: Mexico
- Denomination: Roman Catholic Church

The Cathedral Basilica of Our Lady of Guadalupe (Spanish: Catedral Basílica de Nuestra Señora de Guadalupe) Also Colima Cathedral is the name that receives the most important Catholic church of the city of Colima, in Mexico that was designated 12 of October 1998 by Pope John Paul II, like Basilica Minor, since it is the first consecrated to the Virgin of Guadalupe in Latin America. Located in one of the corners of the Libertad Garden, in the center of the city of Colima.

Raised in the same place that the Spaniards assigned for the parish and the royal houses of the city. Its origin goes back to the year 1525 during the colonial era. Built of adobe, ornaments of gold, brick and stone endured this inclement weather and trembling being the oldest cathedral in Mexico and North America, It was completed in 1540.

== See also ==
- Roman Catholicism in Mexico
- Our Lady of Guadalupe
