= Bruce Fine =

American baseball executive (1937–2011)

Bruce Fine (July 7, 1937 – December 28, 2011) served as a vice president and part-owner of the Cleveland Indians baseball team in the 1970s. He also served as treasurer and director of Midwest Bank in Cleveland.

He was born in Cleveland, Ohio and died in Carefree, Arizona.
