= Fred Fono =

Solomon Islands politician (1962–2011)

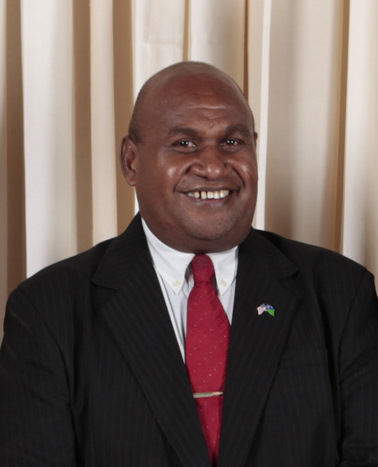
- Fono in 2009

Deputy Prime Minister of Solomon Islands
- In office 21 December 2007 – 25 August 2010
- Monarch: Elizabeth II
- Prime Minister: Derek Sikua
- Preceded by: Vacant
- Succeeded by: Manasseh Maelanga

Personal details
- Born: 10 October 1962 Central Kwara'ae, Solomon Islands
- Died: 26 December 2011 (aged 49) Honiara, Solomon Islands
- Party: People's Alliance Party
- Spouse: Abby Fono

Fred Iro Fono (10 October 1962 – 26 December 2011) was a Solomon Islands politician, serving as the country's Deputy Prime Minister and Minister for Rural Development and Indigenous Affairs from December 2007 to August 2010. He was a member of the People's Alliance Party and represented Central Kwara'ae Constituency in the National Parliament for thirteen years from 1997 to 2010, when he was defeated for re-election by MP Jackson Fiulaua.

Fono served as Chief Commercial Officer of the Corporate Division of the Ministry of Commerce & Primary Industries and as Provincial Secretary for Malaita Province before being elected to the National Parliament for the first time in the August 1997 parliamentary election. He then served as Minister for Development and Planning from 29 September 1997 to 5 June 2000. He was a candidate for the position of Deputy Speaker of the National Parliament later that year, but withdrew his candidacy on 1 December 2000, leaving Jackson Sunaone to win the post without opposition. He was re-elected to his seat in the December 2001 parliamentary election and subsequently served as Deputy Speaker of the National Parliament from 20 December 2001 to 3 January 2005. He was then Minister for National Planning and Aid Coordination from 4 February 2005 to 4 April 2006. Re-elected to his seat in April 2006, he served as Deputy Prime Minister and Minister for National Planning and Aid Coordination in the short-lived government of Snyder Rini from 21 April 2006 to 4 May 2006. Fono was the government's candidate to replace Rini as Prime Minister, but he was defeated by Manasseh Sogavare in the parliamentary vote on 4 May, receiving 22 votes against 28 for Sogavare. He was then elected as Leader of the Opposition on 5 May, receiving unanimous support from the members of the opposition.

Criticizing Sogavare's worsening of relations with Australia through his refusal to extradite Attorney-General Julian Moti, Fono introduced a motion of no-confidence against Sogavare that was defeated on 11 October 2006; the motion was supported by 17 members of parliament, while 28 voted against it. After Sogavare was defeated in another no-confidence vote in December 2007, Fono became Deputy Prime Minister and Minister for Rural Development and Indigenous Affairs under Prime Minister Derek Sikua on 21 December 2007.

In the lead up to the 2010 general election, Fono founded the People's Congress Party, although it would go on to only win one seat.

In December 2011, Prime Minister Gordon Darcy Lilo mentioned Fono as a possible High Commissioner to Papua New Guinea, but he never took up the post.

Fred Fono died at National Referral Hospital (NRH) in Honiara at approximately 11 p.m. on 26 December 2011, at the age of 49. It is believed that Fono contracted a brief illness after returning from a trip to Auki, Malaita Province, on 23 December. Fono was survived by his wife, Abby, his two daughters, Joy and Rachel, and his son Fred Junior.
