= Thomas H. Campbell III =

American politician

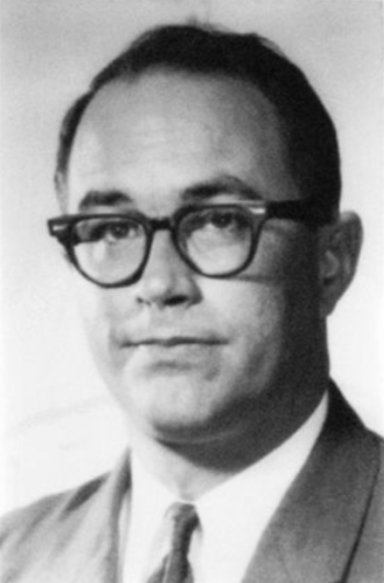

Member of the Mississippi House of Representatives
- In office 1960–1964
- In office 1968–1984

Personal details
- Born: July 26, 1932 Yazoo City, Mississippi, U.S.
- Died: December 19, 2011 (aged 79)
- Education: University of Mississippi

Thomas H. Campbell III (July 26, 1932 – December 19, 2011) was an American politician. He served as a member of the Mississippi House of Representatives.

== Life and career ==
Campbell was born in Yazoo City, Mississippi. He attended the University of Mississippi.

Campbell served in the Mississippi House of Representatives from 1960 to 1964 and again from 1968 to 1984.

Campbell died on December 19, 2011, at the age of 79.
