= Armando Brambilla =

Roman Catholic bishop

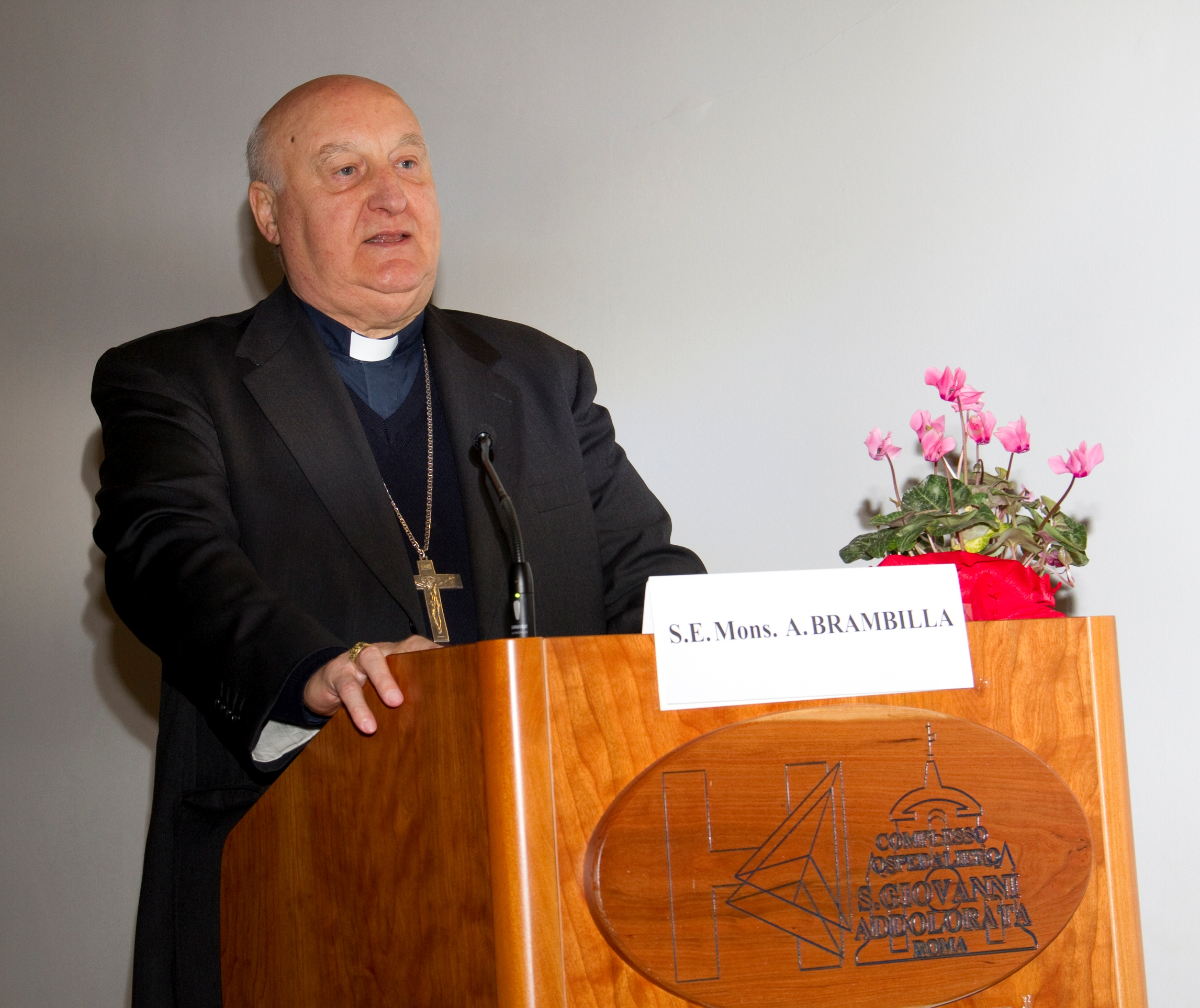

Armando Brambilla (21 January 1942 – 24 December 2011) was the Roman Catholic titular bishop of Ioninum and auxiliary bishop of the Diocese of Rome, Italy.

Ordained to the priesthood in 1977, Brambilla became bishop in 1994.
