= Bert Muhly =

American mayor and academic (1923–2011)

Louis B. "Bert" Muhly (June 18, 1923 – December 16, 2011) was an American politician, academic, planning practitioner and social activist.

== Planning career ==
Muhly's professional planning career spanned 39 years in California. He spent twenty years as a practitioner and the remainder as a teacher in the Environmental Studies Program at the University of California, Santa Cruz (UCSC) and the Graduate Planning Program of California State University, San Jose (CSUSJ). He was Professor Emeritus from CSUSJ since his retirement in 1989. Many of Bert's students, whom he mentored with great enthusiasm and insight, went on to successful careers in city planning, environmental policy and social justice at the local, regional, state, national and international level.

== Education ==
Muhly received a BS degree in Business Administration from University of California, Berkeley in 1948, and an MCP degree from the Department of City and Regional Planning at Berkeley in 1952. He served as the Director of Planning for Tulare County (3 years), Kern Engineering Corporation (2 years) and Santa Cruz County (9 1/2 years). Before embarking on his teaching career, he attended the Planning Certificate Program on British New Towns and Social Planning at the University of Manchester, England (1970).

He also served professional organizations, first, The American Institute of Planners (AIP), and subsequently the American Institute of Certified Planners (AICP) on more committees and assignments than he can recall, but the most notable was his being elected as the first Director of the Central Section of the California Chapter of AIP (CCAIP), Vice-president and Legislative Chair of CCAIP, and President of CCAIP from 1965-66. Several years later he was elected Director of the Northern Section of AIP. He was elected in 2000 as a Fellow (F.A.I.C.P.) of the American Institute of Certified Planners.

== Political career ==
Muhly's political career coincided with the beginning of his teaching career in 1970. During the next three years he played a significant role in the development and promotion of legislation to protect the California Coast which ultimately resulted in the passage of Proposition 20, the California Coastal Protection Act establishing the California Coastal Commission effective in February, 1973.

Between March 1973 and November 1981, he was elected and served two four year terms on the Santa Cruz City Council, serving as mayor from 1974 to 1975. Throughout his eight years on the City Council he was the City's representative to the Association of Monterey Bay Area Governments (AMBAG), served as AMBAG President; was appointed as AMBAG's representative on the Regional Coastal Commission, and was elected the first President of CAL-COG, an organization of the 24 Councils of Government (COGs), such as AMBAG that then existed in California. At this time he was appointed to the Planning Advisory and Assistance Council (PAAC) serving governor Jerry Brown.

While on the City Council, he served on several committees of the League of California Cities, and was appointed to the National League of Cities' Environmental Committee and National Science Foundation Committee.

His activity in partisan politics during his period as a member of the Santa Cruz City Council included the following: a member of the California State Democratic Central Committee; co-chair of the California 16th Senatorial District Committee; Santa Cruz County Chair or co-chair of the Presidential Campaigns of Jimmy Carter and Jerry Brown; the gubernatorial campaigns of Leo McCarthy and Tom Bradley, and significant roles in the successful Congressional campaigns of Leon Panetta and Sam Farr.

== Social justice ==
Beginning in 1982, Muhly visited Jinotepe, Nicaragua, more than 25 times, where he has been actively involved in projects for the empowerment of the Nicaraguan people. Projects during the years of the Contra War and since 1990 are numerous and were commented on as such:

As a City Council member and as Mayor, Bert, you were a leader on numerous critical issues. You were among those who turned the City towards progressive politics ... and you focused on the fundamental needs of the City...your hard work through the years has given you stature and significance far beyond office or title. Candidates like myself from the local level right up to the national level have benefited from your enthusiasm, commitment, and I can say this now constructive criticism.

— former White House Chief of Staff Leon Panetta

Your dedication to a compassionate foreign policy and to bettering the lives of our friends and neighbors in Central America is well known. You contributed immeasurably to my own efforts in Congress, but your willingness to be involved in every facet of this issue was beyond compare. You traveled, you wrote, you did whatever you believed was necessary. Above all, you had a direct and very real impact, and although there are few as citizens can claim to have helped change national policy, you can! You have changed lives and institutions wherever you have gone.

— Leon Panetta
