= Maurice Huggett =

Maurice Huggett (7 July 1945 – 17 December 2011) was the proprietor of a private members club known as the Phoenix Artist Club in Soho, London.

Yet this remarkably warm and welcoming dive is about as far removed from The Groucho, or the rarefied environs of Soho House as it's possible to get... a hive of hangovers, teeming with sozzled actors, out-of-work soap stars, comedians, musicians, writers and assorted hacks, tumbling over one another in a delirious heap, as opposed to engaging in anything so cynical as 'networking'. Mostly because, after a night in the Phoenix, you'd be hard-pressed to remember anybody's name. Through it all, Maurice reigned supreme (or like a Supreme), dancing, pouting and gliding around the hubbub in a vast and never-ending collection of legendary waistcoats to a piped soundtrack of Fiddler on the Roof, offering advice, comfort, support, and an inexhaustible supply of friendship and queenly asides. In Quentin Crisp's phrase, "one of the stately homos of England".

— Word Magazine, December 2011)

== Career ==
The son of a builder, Huggett worked as a bank clerk before joining American Express in London's Haymarket, working for the Keith Prowse ticket agency in 1969 at The Dorchester hotel. After a period working for Pan Am, Huggett lived in pre-revolution Tehran to handle incoming tours for Air Express. According to The Daily Telegraph "one night he looked out from his room to see the streets running red. He called the BBC and gave a dramatic account. Only later did he discover the truth. The first targets of the Islamic fundamentalists were wine cellars, and the streets had been running not with blood but with red wine." He returned to London on the last flight out of Tehran, and obtained a publican's licence. He then managed the Players' Theatre beneath the arches at Charing Cross station.

Opened in 1988 by John Mahoney, Huggett acquired the Phoenix Artist Club, formerly Shuttleworth's at The Phoenix or "Shuts", in the mid-1990s, located in a basement beneath the Phoenix Theatre on the Charing Cross Road. The basement was originally used as a rehearsal room and dressing room for the theatre, but had been converted into a bar and restaurant during the 1970s. Under his ownership, it acquired extensive refurbishment. The Phoenix became a hub of late night drinking and debauchery for artists, actors, comedians, producers, writers and journalists. Karaoke was banned, the jukebox abolished, and Huggett became a centrepiece of flamboyance, renowned for giving impromptu performances of showtunes. Among the Phoenix clientele were the crime novelist Martina Cole, singer Lady Gaga, comedian Noel Fielding and the actors Jude Law, Keira Knightley and John Hurt.

Huggett flatly refused entry to the Arctic Monkeys because they looked "too scruffy" - despite their latest single being at the top of the British charts at the time. The writer Bryony Gordon remembers Huggett "barred an acquaintance of mine for six months due to drunken misbehaviour. When my friend ventured back at the end of his ban, he was warmly embraced by Maurice who asked where on earth he had been, and by the way, would he like free membership." Another regular recalls "amid the swirl of tottering A-listers and communal singing, Huggett framed strict house rules. Anyone moving furniture, for example, would prompt him to grab his microphone and to command: "Don’t touch the props! Leave the props alone!”"

== Personal life ==
Huggett died after a short illness in London in December 2011. Those at his bedside reported his death was accompanied to the soundtrack of Man of La Mancha, one of his favourite musicals.
