= Rogelio Sánchez González =

Mexican prelate of the Roman Catholic Church

- Bishop of Diocese of Colima
- Church: Roman Catholic Church
- See: Diocese of Colima
- In office: 1972 - 1980
- Predecessor: Leonardo Viera Contreras
- Successor: José Fernández Arteaga
- Previous post(s): Prelate

Orders
- Ordination: March 25, 1944

Personal details
- Born: 23 April 1921; San José de Gracia, Mexico
- Died: 22 December 2011 (aged 90)

Rogelio Sánchez González (23 April 1921 – 22 December 2011) was a Mexican prelate of the Roman Catholic Church.

Sánchez González was born in San José de Gracia, Michoacán, Mexico. Sánchez González ordained a priest on March 25, 1944. Sánchez González was appointed bishop of the Diocese of Colima on July 23, 1972, and ordained bishop on October 4, 1972. Sánchez González would resign as bishop of Colima on February 8, 1980. Bishop Rogelio Sanchez Gonzalez died December 22, 2011, at San Jose de Gracia, Michoacan.
