= Antonio Barone =

Italian physicist (1939–2011)

- Born: 29 September 1939; Naples, Italy
- Died: 4 December 2011 (aged 72); Naples, Italy
- Citizenship: Italy
- Education: University of Naples Federico II

Antonio Barone (29 September 1939 – 4 December 2011) was an Italian physicist. He was Emeritus Professor of the Federico II University of Naples and Director of the CNR Cybernetics Institute in Arco Felice (Naples), Italy. He is best known for his work on superconductivity and Josephson effect.

== Professional life ==
Antonio Barone studied at Physics Faculty of the Federico II University in Naples. After the degree in Physics (1967) he joined the National Research Council of Italy (C.N.R.) at the Laboratory of Cybernetics in Arco Felice, Naples (1968). In 1977, he became director of the Institute of Cybernetics and held this position until 1991. In 1987, he had the Structure of Matter chair at the Engineering Faculty of the Federico II University in Naples where he definitively moved in 1992. Retired in 2009, he was nominated Emeritus Professor in 2011. Antonio Barone was also member of the Board of Delegates of the Material Research Society and the European Physical Society.

== Work on superconductivity and Josephson effect ==
The initial research activity of Antonio Barone was in the field of nuclear physics and radiation detectors. Superconductors stimulated new approaches to radiation detection and this was the original reason to drive Barone's interests towards superconductivity. In 1968, the birth of the Cybernetics Laboratory offered him the possibility to work in a joint project USA–Italy and in 1971 he was at the University of Wisconsin Madison to participate in the pioneering studies on the Josephson effect.

The research activity on Josephson junctions opened a wide variety of stimulating subjects in which Barone was deeply involved. These range from the use of Josephson junctions as neuristors and soliton propagation in "long" Josephson structures, to fluctuations phenomena, from light sensitive junctions and proximity effect to the development of innovative superconducting devices.

He was the co-author of the famous book "Physics and applications of the Josephson effect" (written jointly with G. Paternò). This became rapidly the reference text for the Josephson effect, as documented by thousands of citations and was translated into Russian, Japanese and Chinese.

In 1983, Barone was awarded by the Russian Academy of Sciences in Moscow of the highest academic title of "Doctor of the Physical-Mathematical Sciences," and later of the Kapitza Prize. He was the first scientist of a western country to receive these prestigious honours.

After the discovery of high-Tc superconductors (HTS) Barone gave significant contributions in this field, reporting original results since June 1987 in the Berkeley conference on "archetype" high-Tc Josephson junctions. Of great impact were the studies on unconventional superconductivity, first developed for "p-wave" superconductors.

Macroscopic quantum phenomena and particle detectors have been the principal areas of Barone's research. His publications in these fields span more than 40 years and include numerous contributions made in collaboration with his co-workers.

Topics range from the fundamentals of macroscopic quantum tunneling to barrier penetration in non-stationary field, to finally project into a wider vision of macroscopic quantum phenomena in unconventional systems.

In December 2001 for the Centennial Events of the Nobel Prize, the Nobel Foundation invited Antonio Barone in Gothenburg and Stockholm as speaker at the "Nobel Symposium for Physics" to give the lecture on the Josephson Effect.

With the increase of his scientific stature, a large scientific community of more than 80 scientists (one of the largest in Europe) was grown in the Naples area and contributed to establish the "Barone's Superconductivity School" with more than 200 people who directly or indirectly graduated under his supervision. This community nowadays spreads over three universities and two CNR Institutes and is still active in several directions of material science and device physics well beyond the edges of superconductivity.
