= Marian Wohlwender =

American baseball player

- Catcher
- Born: March 13, 1922
- Died: December 17, 2011 (aged 89); Fort Myers, Florida, U.S.
- Batted: Right Threw: Right

Teams
- Kenosha Comets (1943)

Marian A. Wohlwender [Fricker] (March 13, 1922 – December 17, 2011) was a catcher who played for the Kenosha Comets of the All-American Girls Professional Baseball League (AAGPBL) in 1943. She batted and threw right-handed. Her nickname was Wooly. She died in Fort Myers, Florida.
