= Brian Sparkes =

Canadian biochemist (1941–2011)

Brian G. Sparkes (November 4, 1941 – December 18, 2011) was a Canadian biochemist. In 1968, he was the first to isolate a naturally occurring bacterial growth inhibitor in a discovery that had worldwide impact for cancer research. His groundbreaking paper was published in the academic journal Science. He was awarded a National Cancer Institute fellowship to study at McGill University. Sparkes performed pioneering research in the role of immune failure in burn injuries. In 1994 he was awarded the "Ambroise Pare Award" for his work on burn injury.

Sparkes was born November 4, 1941, in Newport, Monmouthshire. He immigrated to Canada in 1951 and completed his secondary schooling in London, Ontario. Sparkes Earning two degrees from the University of Western Ontario, and earned his doctorate at the University of Ottawa.

Sparkes died, at the age of 70, at St. Michael's Hospital in Toronto, Ontario, after succumbing to the effects of aggressive lymphoma.
