= Solomon Abera =

Ethiopian journalist (1968–2011)

- Born: Tsegakiristos; 1968
- Died: December 2011 (aged 42–43)
- Occupations: presenter, textile worker
- Spouse: Senait
- Children: Rodas & Makda
- Writing career
- Language: Tigrigna, Amharic & English

Solomon Abera Haile (1968–2011) was a press freedom advocate, and detractor of the Afewerki government. He died of cancer in December 2011.

== Life in Eritrea ==
Before becoming a journalist Abera was a textile worker. Following the Eritrean War of Independence in 1991 he worked for the Ministry of Information in the new Eritrean government. On September 18, 2001, Abera was the news presenter on state-controlled television that announced the end of Eritrea's independent press and the rounding up of leading independent newspaper editors and ruling-party dissidents. In response to mounting government intimidation and censorship Abera fled Eritrea in 2005.

== Exile ==
Following his departure from Eritrea he became an active critic of the Afewerki government on numerous diaspora websites and an advocate for press freedom. In 2009 he began working with Free Press Unlimited providing several trainings and field missions. In 2011 Abera was among a group of exiled Eritrean journalists who met Prime Minister Meles Zenawi of Ethiopia.

== Criticism ==
Abera's detractors have accused him of being an informant and collaborator with the Ethiopian government, and the Derg regime in particular, during the Eritrean War of Independence.
