= Diocese of Ciudad Guzmán =

Roman Catholic diocese in Mexico

Coordinates: 19.70361°N 103.463088°W

Diocese of Ciudad Guzmán Dioecesis Guzmanopolitana Diócesis de Ciudad Guzmán
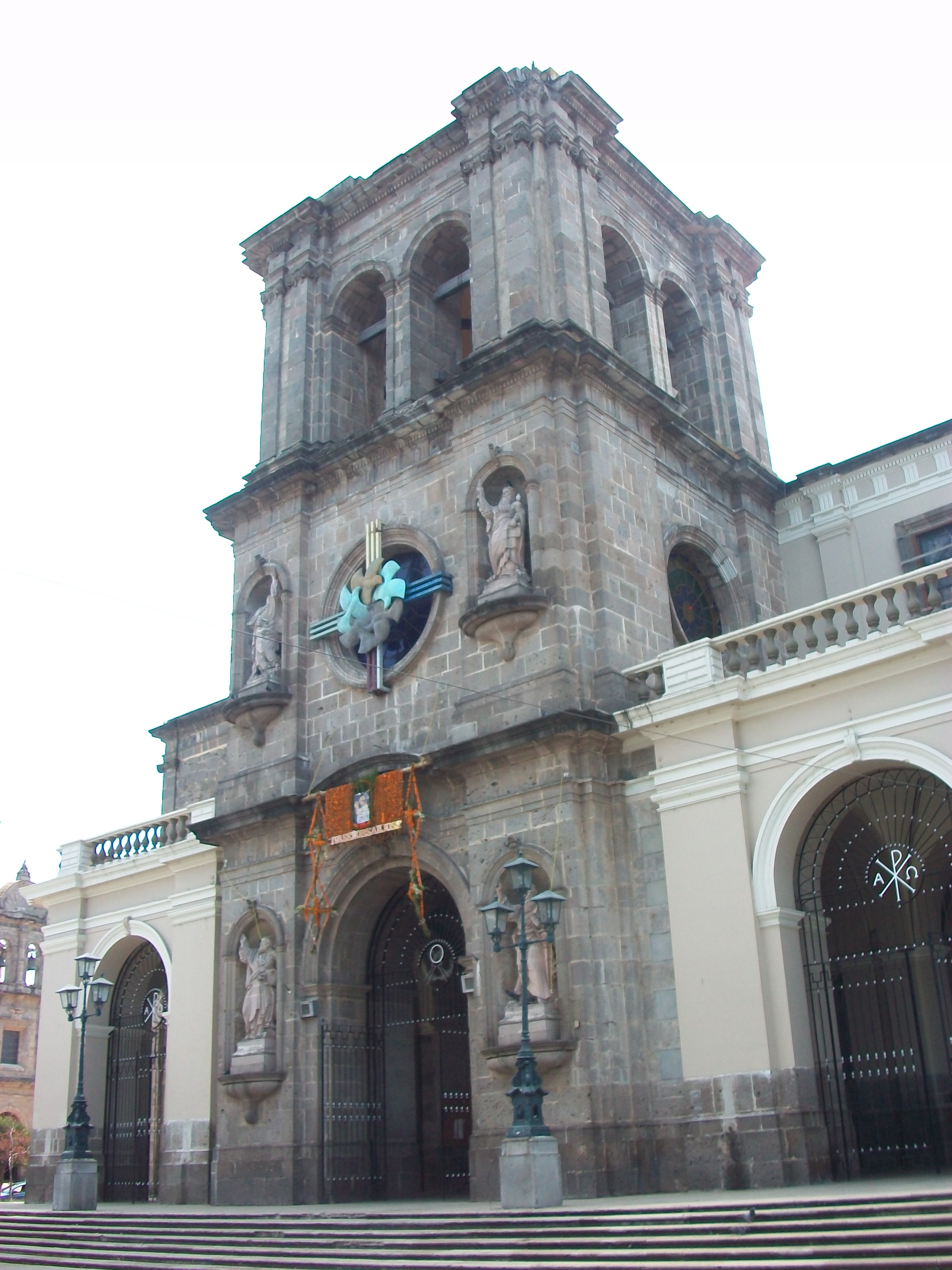
- Cathedral of St. Joseph

Location
- Country: Mexico
- Ecclesiastical province: Province of Guadalajara
- Metropolitan: Ciudad Guzmán, Jalisco

Statistics
- Area: 3,213 sq mi (8,320 km^{2})
- Population: Total; Catholics: (as of 2006); 442,400; 416,170 (94.1%)
- Parishes: 52

Information
- Denomination: Roman Catholic
- Rite: Roman Rite
- Established: 25 March 1972 (53 years ago)
- Cathedral: Cathedral of St. Joseph

Current leadership
- Pope: Leo XIV
- Bishop: Herculano Medina Garfias
- Metropolitan Archbishop: Francisco Robles Ortega
- Bishops emeritus: Óscar Armando Campos Contreras

Map
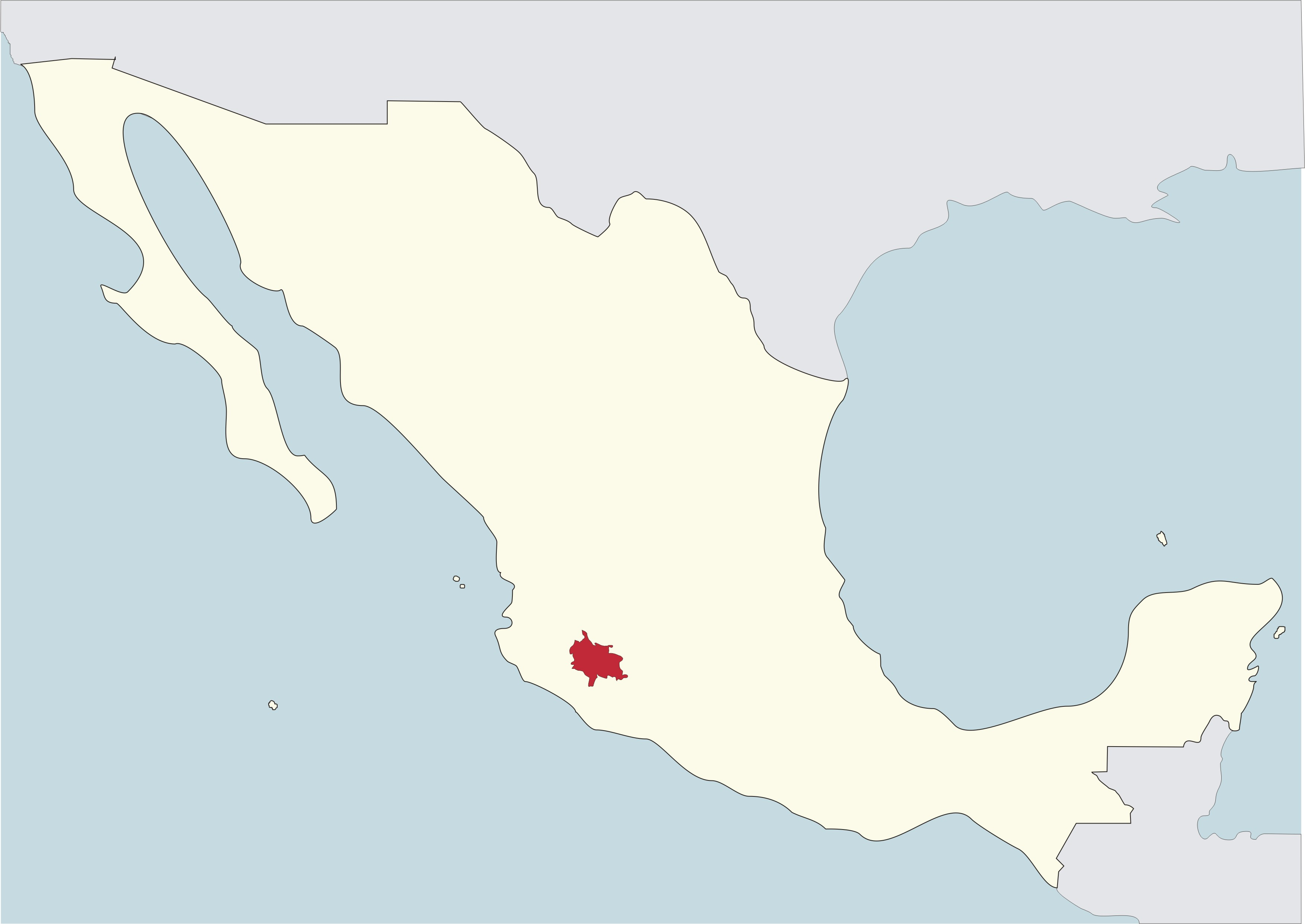

The Roman Catholic Diocese of Ciudad Guzmán (Latin: Dioecesis Guzmanopolitana) (erected 25 March 1972) is a suffragan diocese of the Archdiocese of Guadalajara, in Jalisco, Mexico. The diocesan seat is the Cathedral of San José, Ciudad Guzmán.

== Ordinaries ==
- Leonardo Viera Contreras (1972-1977)
- Serafín Vásquez Elizalde (1977-1999)
- Braulio Rafael León Villegas (1999-2017)
- Óscar Armando Campos Contreras (25 Sep 2017 Appointed - )

== Episcopal see ==
- Ciudad Guzmán, Jalisco

== External links and references ==
- "Diocese of Ciudad Guzmán". Catholic-Hierarchy.
