= Patrick Bashford =

British model and guitarist

- Born: 15 November 1929; Beuthen, Germany, now Bytom, Poland
- Died: 21 December 2011 (aged 82)
- Spouse: Ana Raquel Satre

Patrick Bashford (1929–2011) was a Polish-born professor of classical guitar at the Royal College of Music, Vogue model, and familiar face of the 1950s & 60s.

== Early life ==
John Patrick Bashford was born at Beuthen, Germany, now Bytom, Poland. His parents were Maria who was Polish and Roderick who was British. Both worked for the British Consular Service in Germany until the Second World War, when they were transferred to Sweden.

Bashford was educated at Wells House prep school in Malvern, St Paul's, southwest London, and then at the Guildhall School of Music.

== Career ==
It is said that his pioneering work helped turn male modelling into a respectable profession.

As a model he was noted for his amber eyes and athlete's carriage. He worked as a model for over thirty years.

In later life he became a classical guitarist. It is said that his love of the guitar came from his Polish nanny singing him lullabies. He was 20 when he was invited by American poet Samuel Menashe on a trip to Andalucia and fell in love with the sound. Patrick studied with José Rey de la Torre at Mannes College in New York City. He became a world recognised expert in Spanish classical guitar.

Bashford became a professor at the Royal College of Music in 1972.

== Family ==
His wife was Ana Raquel Satre, an operatic soprano. They had one child. They separated in the 1980s. Bashford had an older brother, Christopher. His uncle was Sir Henry Bashford, honorary Physician to King George VI. His ancestors served with both the British and French fleets at the Battle of Trafalgar.
