= Archdiocese of Gandhinagar =

Roman Catholic archdiocese in Gujarat, India

Coordinates: 23.2108°N 72.6508°E

Archdiocese of Gandhinagar Archidioecesis Gandhinagarensis ગાંધીનગરનો આર્કડિયોસીસ

Location
- Country: India
- Ecclesiastical province: Gandhinagar

Statistics
- Area: 29,940 km^{2} (11,560 sq mi)
- Population: Total; Catholics: (as of 2011); 10,300,000; 15,500 (0.2%)
- Parishes: 17

Information
- Denomination: Catholic Church
- Sui iuris church: Latin Church
- Rite: Roman Rite
- Established: 11 November 2002
- Cathedral: Prem Avatar Isu Mandir in Gandhinagar

Current leadership
- Pope: Leo XIV
- Metropolitan Archbishop: Thomas Ignatius MacWan
- Bishops emeritus: Stanislaus Fernandes, S.J.

Map
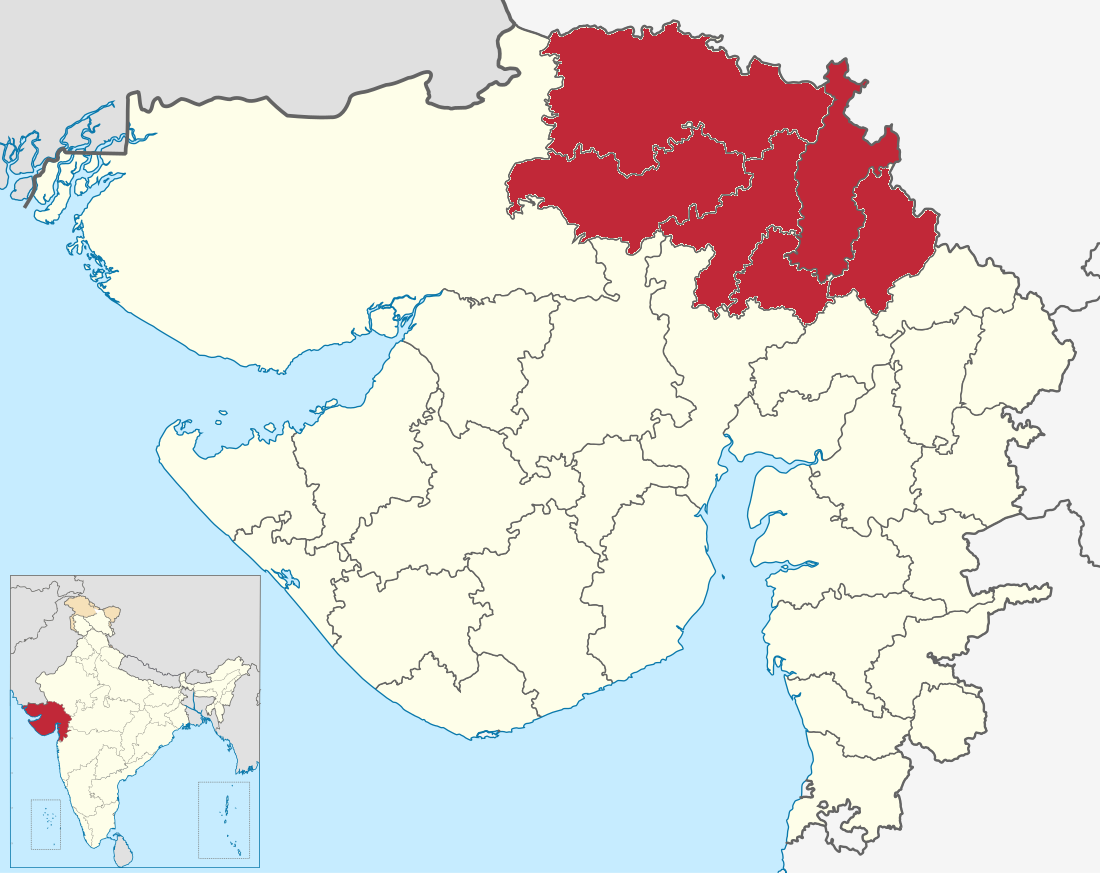

Website
- Website of the Archdiocese

The Archdiocese of Gandhinagar (Latin: Gandhinagaren(sis)) is a Latin Church ecclesiastical jurisdiction or archdiocese of the Catholic Church located in the city of Gandhinagar in India. The archdiocese is a metropolitan see with three suffragan dioceses in its ecclesiastical province.

== History ==
- 11 November 2002: Established as the Archdiocese of Gandhinagar from the Diocese of Ahmedabad. Bishop Stanislaus Fernandes, SJ, was named Archbishop. The territory of the new Archdiocese then comprised the districts of Gandhinagar, Mehsana, Patan, Banaskantha and Sabarkantha.

== Leadership ==
- Archbishops of Gandhinagar
  - Archbishop Thomas Ignatius MacWan (12 June 2015 – present)
  - Archbishop Stanislaus Fernandes, S.J. (11 November 2002 – 12 June 2015)

== Suffragan dioceses ==
- Ahmedabad
- Baroda

== Sources ==
- Archdiocese of Gandhinagar
- GCatholic.org ^{[self-published]}
- Catholic Hierarchy ^{[self-published]}
