= Thomas Ignatius MacWan =

Indian Catholic archbishop

The Most Reverend Thomas Ignatius Macwan
- Archbishop of Gandhinagar
- Archdiocese: Roman Catholic Archdiocese of Gandhinagar
- See: Roman Catholic Archdiocese of Gandhinagar
- Appointed: 12 June 2015
- Installed: 12 September 2015
- Predecessor: Stanislaus Fernandes, S.J.
- Previous post: Bishop of the Roman Catholic Diocese of Ahmedabad

Orders
- Ordination: 9 April 1988
- Consecration: 11 January 2003 by Archbishop Stanislaus Fernandes, S.J.

Personal details
- Born: 14 October 1952 (age 73) Bhavnagar Gujarat
- Residence: Archbishop's House, Sector 8, Gandhinagar 382 008. Gujarat
- Motto: CALLED TO DO GOOD

Styles of Thomas Ignatius Macwan
- Reference style: The Most Reverend
- Spoken style: Your Excellency
- Religious style: Monsignor
- Posthumous style: not applicable

Archbishop Thomas Ignatius Macwan is the current archbishop of the Roman Catholic Archdiocese of Gandhinagar.

== Early life ==
Bishop Thomas was born on 14 October 1952 in Bhavnagar, Gujarat.

== Priesthood ==
Thomas was ordained a Catholic priest on 9 April 1988.

== Episcopate ==
Thomas was appointed Bishop of the Roman Catholic Diocese of Ahmedabad on 11 November 2002 and ordained Bishop on 11 January 2003. He was appointed Archbishop of Roman Catholic Archdiocese of Gandhinagar on 12 June 2015 and installed on 12 September 2015 by Pope Francis.

== Controversy ==
During the 2017 campaign for Gujarat Assembly elections, Archbishop MacWan issued a letter to the Christian community suggesting that they pray for the election of "humane leaders", to "save" India "from nationalist forces". The Legal Rights Observatory lodged a complaint with the Election Commission of India against the archbishop. The Election Commission served a notice to the archbishop, asking for an explanation.
